= Shambaa Kingdom =

Former Kingdom in present-day Tanzania (c. 1730–1962)

The Shambaa Kingdom Uflame wa Usambara (Swahili)
- c.1730s–December 1962
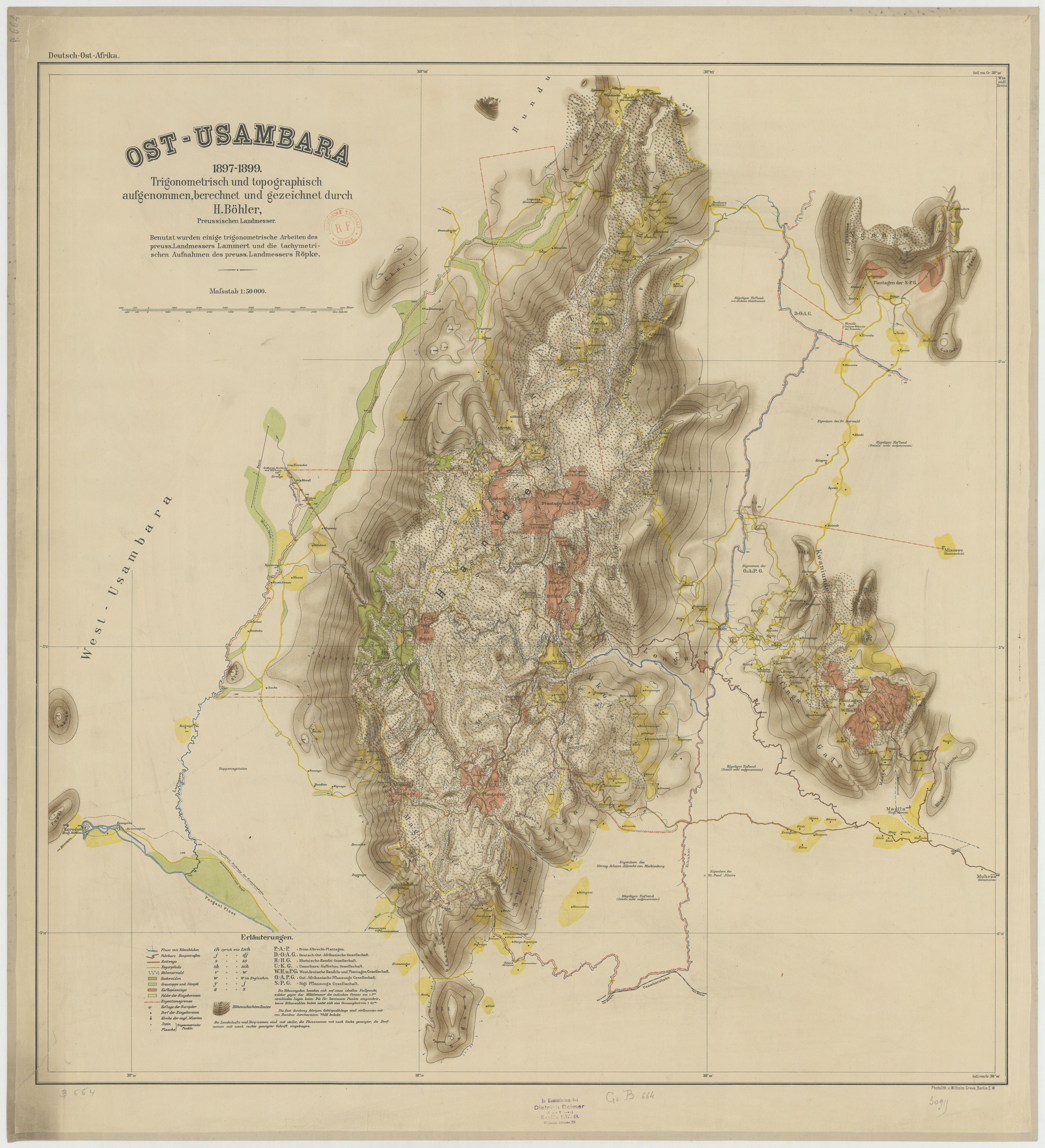
- Location of Shambaa Kingdom c.1897

- Map of Usambara from 1910
- Capital: Vugha
- Official languages: Shambaa
- Common languages: Shambaa, Ngulu, Bondei, Zigua, Digo, Pare & Swahili
- Religion: African traditional religions & Sunni Islam
- Demonym: Sambaan
- Government: Monarchy
- Mwene (King)
  - First: Mwene Mbegha (c.1730s-1790s)
  - Last: Mwene Kimweri Mputa Magogo (1947-1962)
- History
  - Established: c.1730s
  - Disestablished: December 1962
- Currency: None (barter)
Preceded by	Succeeded by
Shambaa chiefdoms	German East Africa; Tanganyika
- Today part of: Tanzania

- Person: Msambaa
- People: Wasambaa
- Language: Kisambaa
- Country: Usambara Kingdom

The Shambaa Kingdom or Usambara Kingdom also historically referred to as The Kingdom of Usambara ( Umweri ye Shambaai in Shambaa; Ufalme wa Usambara, in Swahili) was a pre-colonial Bantu sovereign kingdom of the Shambaa people on the Usambara mountains in modern-day northern Tanga Region of Tanzania. The Kilindi dynasty ruled the kingdom for more than 232 years, enduring the slave trade, German invasion, and British occupation until the Tanganyikan government disbanded it in 1962.

== Early history ==
The Shambaa kingdom was named after their homeland, Shambaai, which translates to "where the bananas thrive" in Shambala language.

The population of the Usambara Mountains includes groups claiming ancestral residence in the region since ancient times, while others assert a migration predating the arrival of the Kilindi. Many early clans from southern Usambara migrated to the fertile hills from Zigua during famines, particularly in Ngulu. These settlers benefited from increased rainfall and robust banana cultivation, leading them to develop extensive irrigation systems. Settlement patterns varied, with some groups residing at the plains' edges, others ascending the slopes, and yet others clearing forests in higher altitudes. By the late nineteenth century, when Europeans arrived, the Shambaa were actively engaged in deforestation, advancing from the mountain peripheries to higher central regions.

In this period, villages located merely a mile apart often viewed each other with suspicion, lacking any central political structure. Typically, descendants of a common ancestor resided together on a single hill, distinct from other groups. These communities engaged in ancestral sacrifices and were capable of founding new villages, often weakening ties between them. However, cooperation among different villages was deemed essential, extending beyond economic specialization. Rituals, such as ancestor sacrifices and rites of passage, required a ritual leader from outside the host village. Marriages formed alliances between villages. Although village men were largely self-sufficient, Shambaa religious practices necessitated frequent communal gatherings for feasting and dancing. Disputes involving members from separate villages were adjudicated by elders from a broader area. Economic cooperation existed as well, with irrigation systems benefiting entire neighborhoods, and trade in shell ornaments, salt, and iron implements facilitating regional interactions.

The emergence of more centralized political structures was catalyzed by the Masai incursion into Tanzania from the north, likely in the early 18th century. The threat of Masai raids rendered settlement on lower slopes perilous, prompting the formation of centralized towns for defense, even in elevated regions. This period also witnessed an influx of refugees seeking the relative safety of the mountains, notably the Mbughu and the Nango (a major clan of the Mbugu), from the Masai steppe. These groups, particularly those reliant on cattle, faced existential threats from the Masai. Prior migrations to Usambara from Zigua, Pare, and Taita involved small family groups easily assimilated into local culture. However, the Mbughu and Nango arrived in large, organized contingents, striving to preserve their distinct identities. The Mbughu maintained separation until the colonial era, tending cattle in high forests beyond Shambaa agricultural zones. The Nango dispersed throughout Shambaa settlements, adopting the language and much of the culture while retaining their original religious practices. Certain rituals necessitated periodic gatherings of the Nango in Shume, where their leader, a figure of significant influence, resided.

== Kilindi dynasty ==
The Usambara region, into which the Kilindi arrived, was experiencing significant turmoil due to recent Maasai raids and a substantial influx of immigrants from foreign cultures. It was in this context that the Kilindi royal group made their entrance.

The first king of Usambara was Mbegha, whose story is widely recounted throughout the region. Originating from Ngulu, Mbegha was initially a hunter who was expelled by his relatives, leading to an extended period of wandering and hunting. Upon reaching Usambara, he began hunting along the southern mountain edges.

The Shambaa people encountered him and were impressed by his generosity, as he provided them with meat. They appreciated his ability to hunt the wild pigs that were destroying their crops. Mbegha embarked on a celebrated journey through Usambara, during which he hunted pigs, assisted in resolving disputes, and distributed meat freely. In gratitude and admiration, the Shambaa offered him wives and proclaimed him king of all Usambara.

=== The settling of the Usambara ===
The Shambaa population, despite diverse origins, shares a cultural unity rooted in the region's overarching cultural coherence. This unity is evident among two categories of neighboring groups.

The first category includes the Zigua and Bondei peoples, whose languages are easily understandable to Shambaa speakers, differing only slightly more than dialects. Rituals across the region, encompassing the Zigula, Shambaa, and Bondei, exhibit similarities.

The second category consists of neighboring groups with ecological settings similar to that of the Shambaa, such as the highland Taita and Pare. These cultures share medical knowledge, folk botany, agricultural practices, and rituals closely tied to the highland environment. Cultural similarities have been reinforced by centuries of migration between highland areas, as migrants preferred settling in familiar environments due to the specificity of agricultural knowledge to particular ecological settings.

The people of Ngulu, a primary source of the southern Shambaa population, are part of both related cultural groups. Many Ngulu reside in a highland environment, while their culture aligns with the Zigua complex. Most early Shambaa descent groups claim origins from Ngulu, other hilly Zigua, Taita, and Pare areas. For example, the people of Ziai, who were the first to welcome Mbegha into Shambaai, originated in Ngulu. The Wakina Tui, who provided Mbegha with his royal capital, also hailed from Ngulu. Thus, Mbegha, himself from Ngulu, was generally among kinsmen. The Hea of Ubii came from the mountain of Hea in Zigua. The Washu Waja Nkobo, a significant group in Bumbuli during Mbegha's arrival, claim ancient residence in Shambaa. Taita and Pare origins are frequently found in northern Shambaai.

The unity among highland peoples is evident not only in Shambaai but likely extends to all areas from which the early Shambaa population emerged. Research indicates Ngulu and Taita were crucial dispersal areas for the Pare population. Shortly before Mbegha's arrival, two significant groups of immigrants, the Mbughu and the Nango, arrived from regions likely hundreds of miles away on the Laikipia Plateau, northwest of Mount Kenya. Their arrival set the stage for the kingdom's formation. Events leading to the kingdom's founding began decades earlier, involving interactions among East Africa's major linguistic groups: Bantu, Cushites, and Nilotes.

== The founding of the Kingdom ==
During a time of disunity, Mbegha entered Shambaai, a region divided by internal conflicts. He began his journey from Ngulu, an area without centralized political structures, and first established a lasting relationship at Kwa Mbiu in Zigua through a blood partnership. Upon reaching Shambaai, he stayed at Leopard’s Cave near Ziai, where he and Ziai's leader, Shenyeo, formed a unique blood partnership, highlighting Mbegha's feared status as a magician and hunter-warrior.

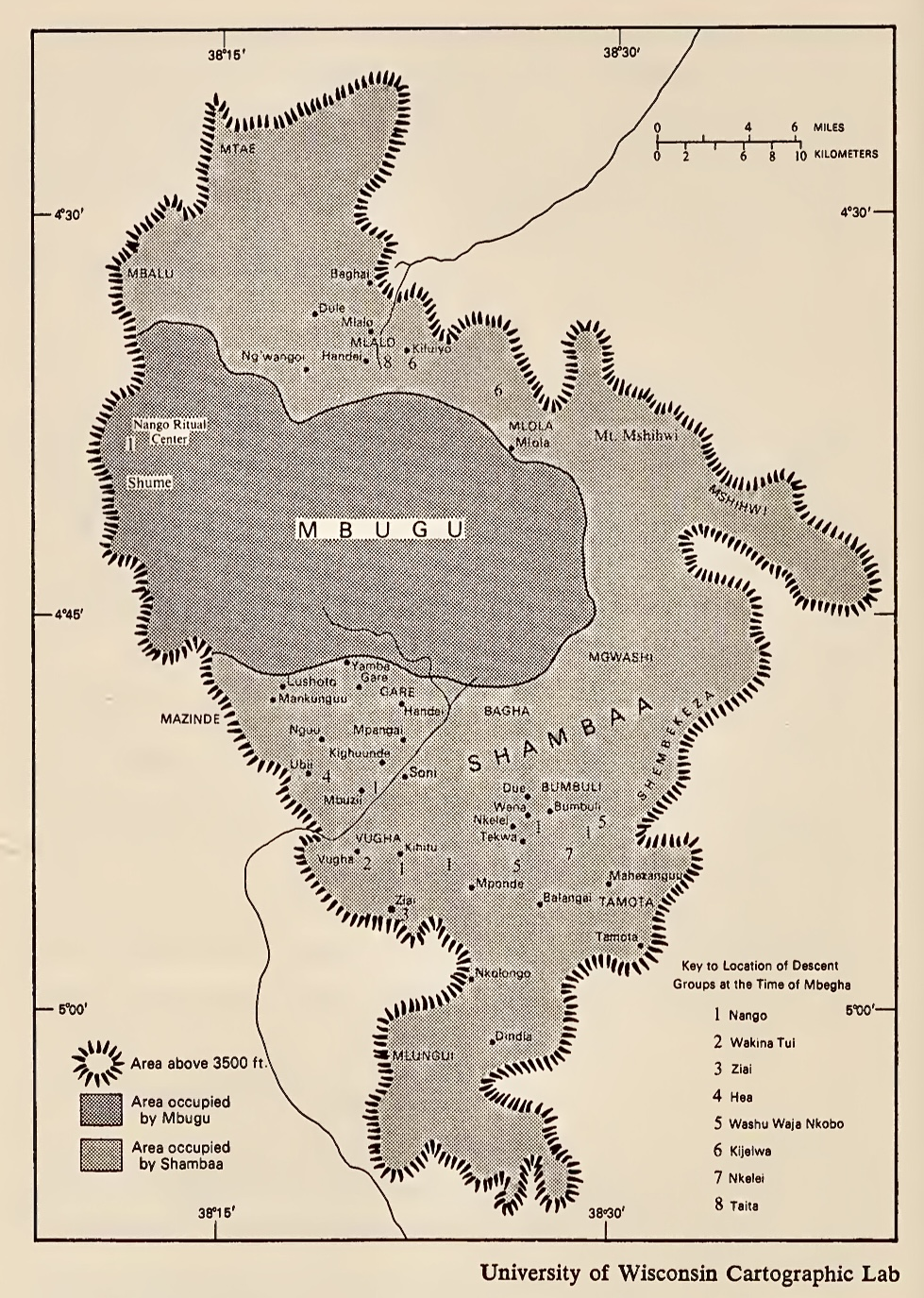
Map of Shambaa and Mbugu lands c1800s

Despite Ziai’s relative weakness, Mbegha moved to Bumbuli and was later invited to Vugha by the Wakina Tui, who welcomed him as their leader. He solidified alliances through marriage and blood partnerships, building personal relationships with key groups without establishing a formal political office. These alliances were based on shared interests among the older Shambaa population.

Mbegha's rise to power can be attributed to his ability to forge personal alliances between two historically rival regions, Vugha and Bumbuli, which are among the most densely populated areas of southern Shambaai. Despite their intense competition, both regions recognized the potential benefits of unification and thus formed alliances with Mbegha, a powerful external figure, to restore internal harmony within the Shambaa way of life. Ultimately, they came to accept his leadership.

The mechanisms by which Mbegha transformed his personal influence into a stable authority remain largely unexamined in historical traditions. However, this issue may be less critical than it appears. Research by Southall indicates that in various African states, central authorities could effectively impose their will by leveraging the interests of one faction to suppress dissent in another. This dynamic was evident in Mbegha's informal leadership, as well as in the reigns of his successors.

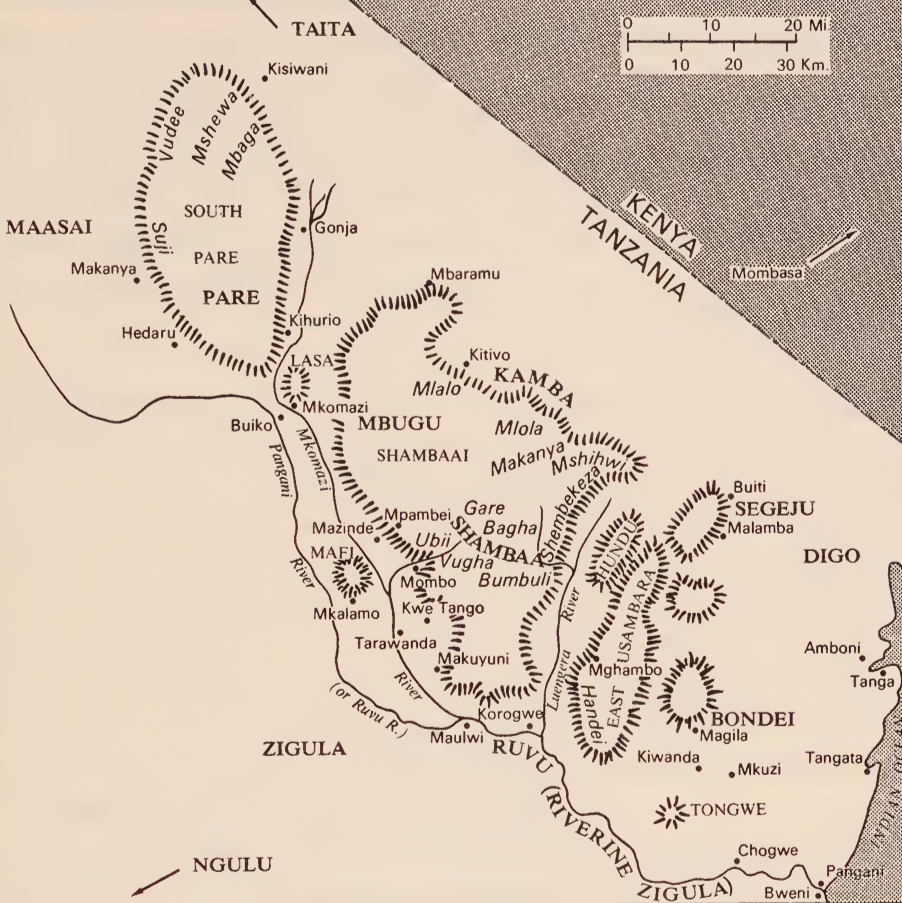
Shambaa kingdom map late 1800s

=== Hea conquest ===
Despite the ambiguity surrounding the transition from Mbegha's temporary alliances to a lasting authority, it is evident that he attained significant power during his lifetime. He expanded his kingdom by conquering the Hea of Ubii, a prominent group in southern Shambaai that had previously resisted his rule. The Hea had resided in Vugha before the arrival of the Wakina Tui and subsequently relocated to Ubii. Their potential hostility towards the Wakina Tui may have originated from their displacement.

The Hea community served as a buffer, shielding the Nango center in Shume from Mbegha's advancing forces. According to Hea accounts, upon his installation by the Wakina Tui, Mbegha began to strategize an assault on Ubii. He expressed intentions to eliminate Mhina, the leader of the Hea. To facilitate this plan, Mbegha allied himself with a girl familiar with Mhina and determined that the optimal moment to strike would be during a public ritual when the atmosphere would be conducive to movement.

Mbegha undertook counter-magic to neutralize Mhina's protective charms. On the day of the celebration, the girl approached Mhina under the guise of affection, remarking on his long beard and the absence of care from his companions. As she engaged him in conversation, she seized the opportunity to attack; when Mhina lifted his chin, she slit his throat. The girl successfully fled amidst the ensuing chaos to Vugha.

After Mhina's death, the Hea maintained their power, prompting Mbegha to plot against them again. He invited Shemdola, Mhina's successor, to a hunting event where he was secretly killed, leading the Hea to flee in fear. The Hea were renowned for their rain magic, facilitated by a ceremonial pot called a kiza. Mbegha confiscated their rain charms, which was essential for consolidating his power, as effective rain magic required a monopoly.

Following the Kilindi conquest, the Hea's social structure shifted. Initially, they used a single sacrificial basket (mfuko) for rituals, but post-conquest, this unity fragmented into multiple baskets. This change reflected broader societal transformations, as groups sharing a basket perform rituals together and prohibit intra-group marriages. When divisions occur, each subgroup acquires its own basket, altering their cooperative dynamics over generations.

Following the conquest of the Hea, the political landscape shifted significantly with the death of Mbegha. The Nango, led by their ritual leader Mbogho, sought to convert his ritual authority into political power in response to Mbegha’s influence. Mbogho attempted to assert that members of his lineage, the Wavina Mpaa, should not be required to pay bride-wealth, equating this right to the king’s authority to collect tribute, a symbol of sovereignty.

Tensions escalated when a member of Mbogho's lineage married outside of it and refused to pay bride-wealth, leading to a violent confrontation that resulted in the death of a family member sent to collect a cow. This incident fractured relations between the lineages, which continue to avoid intermarriage to this day.

After Mbegha's death, Mbogho made a final attempt to govern the Nango in a manner similar to Mbegha’s rule over the Shambaa. While the details surrounding the ensuing conflict remain unclear—due to the Nango's reluctance to share their full history—it is known that Mbogho killed a member of the Mvina Nkima lineage. This act incited the lineage to seek revenge, ultimately aligning with Mbegha’s son, Bughe, who welcomed their support.

Consequently, the decline of the Nango was marked by internal strife, with the Wavina Nkima choosing to collaborate with Bughe rather than remain under Mbogho's leadership. Mbogho’s aggressive stance, exemplified by his declaration that dissent would result in death, ultimately led to his downfall.

=== Nango conquest ===
Following the assassination of their leader Mbogho by the Wavina Nkima subgroup, Bughe initiated a campaign of persecution against the Nango people. The Wavina Nkima, as the instigators of Mbogho's death, were treated favorably, while other Nango groups faced violent reprisals. Accounts indicate that those who recounted the events surrounding Mbogho's death were executed, leading some to adopt the name Kwavi to evade persecution. Many individuals sought refuge in the bush to escape Bughe’s wrath.

In a strategic move similar to Mbegha's earlier actions, Bughe aimed to integrate certain segments of the Nango population into his kingdom. The Wavina Nkima, having conspired against Mbogho, gained a privileged status. During the accession rite of new kings, rituals involving the Wavina Nkima were performed in Tekwa, near Bumbuli. The Kilindi dynasty also adopted kilulumo, a sacrificial practice claimed by the Nango as their own, and often chose Nango women from Bumbuli as the great wives, thereby intertwining Nango heritage within the royal lineage.

By incorporating the Nango into the kingdom, Bughe effectively addressed the longstanding issues that had plagued pre-Kilindi Shambaai. While Mbegha's era was marked by conflict and division, Bughe's reign facilitated not only the defeat of the Nango but also their integration into the political framework of the kingdom. The efforts of Mbegha, Bughe, and their Shambaa supporters culminated in the creation of a larger political synthesis that embraced Nango culture at the core of the kingdom's identity.

== Vugha the Kingdom's capital ==
Vugha was the royal capital of the Shambaa Kingdom. Despite having a sizable population, Vugha was built to resemble a typical Shambaa village. Although he had more authority, the king operated similarly to a village elder. Like a village situated on a hilltop surrounded by banana gardens, Vugha was also located on a hill, encircled by banana groves, with the king at its center. The royal residences were thatched with dried banana sheaths, while the homes of commoners in the outer circle were thatched with wild grass. This thatching functioned as a metaphor: the king ruled over all of Shambaai, just as a village elder claimed ownership of his cultivated banana gardens but not the surrounding wild areas.

Furthermore, Vugha was a microcosm of the whole Shambaai area. The Zimui River was represented by an imaginary north-south line that split the town in two parts, the eastern and western. While officials in the western part of the Vugha served as the king's delegates for the western areas, court officials in the eastern part of the empire oversaw the affairs of the eastern territories.

== Bughe's reign ==
After the death of Mbegha, the throne was assumed by his son Bughe, who effectively ended the authority of the Nango chief in Shume. Notably, Bughe married a Nango woman from the Bumbuli chiefdom, who became the mother of his heir. This period likely marked a significant accommodation between the Shambaa and the Nango. In the chiefdom of Bumbuli, the chief is typically a young man awaiting kingship, resulting in relative independence for the local headmen. The heir in Bumbuli is often too inexperienced to exert strong leadership. Additionally, the Kilindi were prohibited from entering certain Nango towns, such as Tekwa and Wena, except on specific occasions, including meals.

Bughe had three politically significant children: his eldest, Mboza Mamwinu; her full brother, Maghembe, chief of Mulungui; and Kinyashi of Bumbuli, the heir to the throne. Upon Bughe's death, Mboza Mamwinu insisted that Maghembe be crowned king. The people of Vugha, wary of Mboza's influence, supported her request. However, the Nango of Bumbuli exerted considerable pressure, resulting in Kinyashi's ascension to the throne. In response to this decision, Mboza Mamwinu left Vugha in anger, sought out Maghembe, and fled with him to the inaccessible region of Mshihwi. Kinyashi's forces attempted to attack Mshihwi multiple times, but the stronghold proved impregnable. Consequently, Maghembe and his descendants established an independent Kilindi Kingdom in Mshihwi, creating a rival leadership in Usambara with the authority to enforce death sentences.

== Kinyashi's reign ==
Kinyashi's reign was marked by conflict, earning him the moniker "Kinyashi, the Lone Wanderer." His final military engagement was against the Zigua as he sought to expand his territory southward across the Pangani River, ultimately resulting in his death in battle. A poignant story recounts the grief of Kivava, the king's friend, who, heartbroken by the loss of Kinyashi, provoked Zigua warriors until they killed him, and his body fell beside that of the deceased king.

During the nineteenth century, the Shambaa kingdom encompassed significant portions of Bonde to the east of Usambara and Pare to the west. It remains unclear why the kingdom did not expand southward, where Kilindi power was more concentrated. This may be attributed to the Zigua's successful assertion of independence following the death of Kinyashi, which complicated future attempts at conquest. Additionally, in the nineteenth century, towns along the Pangani gained access to new trade in firearms, further hindering Shambaa expansion efforts.

== Kimweri ye Nyumbai's reign ==
After Kinyashi's death, Kimweri ye Nyumbai ruled Usambara from the early nineteenth century until the 1860s, earning recognition as the greatest Kilindi ruler for his long and stable governance. His reign saw increased foreign contacts, which later threatened traditional institutions.

Though often credited with establishing his sons in various chiefdoms, many areas still remembered earlier lines of chiefs. Kimweri appointed his sons to chiefdoms and married into influential families, ensuring that local leaders were held accountable by their maternal relatives. This system allowed for the removal of incompetent chiefs.

Despite the internal order during Kimweri's rule, the kingdom began to fragment after his death, leading to a twenty-year period of conflict among rival factions. While Kimweri had influence in regions like Bonde and coastal ports, his kingdom relied on isolating commoners from foreign interactions. Increased foreign trade, particularly in firearms, and the rise of the Zigua as a military power marked a shift in the region's political landscape, undermining Kimweri's traditional authority.

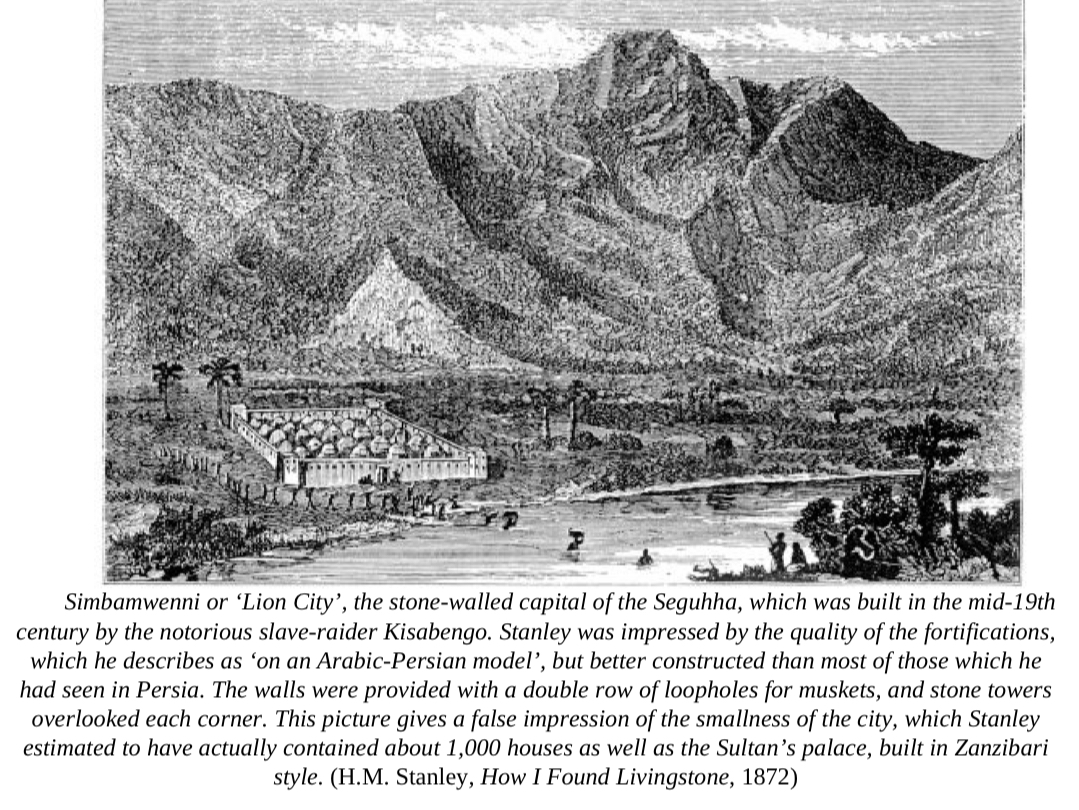
Semboja's fort in Shambaa Kingdom 1892

== The decline and fall of the Kingdom ==
During the reign of Kimweri ye Nyumbai, the authority of the Shambaa king was rooted in his rain magic and unique judicial powers, allowing him to enforce decisions rather than merely mediate disputes. Following the death of Kimweri's father in a conflict with the Zigua, Kimweri opted to withhold rain, leading many Zigua to seek refuge in Usambara.

Usambara's fertility is due to its altitude, but trade routes bypassed the capital, Vugha, in favor of flatter routes through Korogwe and Mazinde. This geographical disadvantage contributed to the kingdom's disintegration after Kimweri's death, as military power shifted to Mazinde, where the chief could more easily acquire arms.

The kingdom fractured when Kimweri's grandson, Shekulwavu, was appointed king after the death of the royal heir. Faced with the challenge of managing his uncles, Shekulwavu's assertiveness led to conflicts, particularly with Semboja, chief of Mazinde. Following a series of disputes, Semboja mobilized Taita warriors, ultimately burning Vugha and leading to Shekulwavu’s death.

Semboja’s power was based on his advantageous position along trade routes, enabling him to gather arms and forge regional alliances. In contrast to Shekulwavu’s traditional legitimacy tied to Vugha, Semboja capitalized on broader interactions and established his authority in Mazinde. After Shekulwavu's death, Semboja installed his son as king in Vugha, but he remained in Mazinde, highlighting a significant shift in political power away from traditional centers.

=== The Bondei rebellion ===
The Rebellion of Kiva, which erupted in 1869 following the death of Shekulwavu, stands as one of the most significant events in Shambaa history. This uprising was notable for being a popular revolt amidst a backdrop of dynastic conflicts. After Shekulwavu's passing, Chanyeghea ascended to the throne and allied with the Bondei people to eliminate the Kilindi rulers in east Usambara and Bonde. The Bondei had long harbored resentment towards the Kilindi, whom they viewed as foreign rulers. In contrast to the deep-rooted Kilindi authority in west Usambara, their rule in Bonde and Pare appeared as an alien conquest.

The Bondei actively sought to kill every Kilindi they encountered, conducting searches throughout villages in the eastern part of west Usambara. Shambaa individuals without familial ties to the Kilindi often betrayed their hiding places, while those with marital connections remained loyal. This dynamic illustrates that loyalty to royal institutions was stronger near the kingdom's center, while the more peripheral Bondei were inclined towards revolution.

Following the Rebellion of Kiva, Bonde maintained its independence, with Shekulwavu's supporters holding east Usambara and Semboja's followers controlling the west, including Vugha. Both factions sought foreign alliances to bolster their positions. Kibanga, Shekulwavu's brother, attempted to enlist support from the British consul and missionaries of the Universities' Mission to Central Africa. Meanwhile, Mbaruk, a rebel against the sultan of Zanzibar, assisted in invading Semboja's territories, while the sultan provided support to Semboja.

The trade in slaves was a significant source of income for both factions during this tumultuous period. In 1888, German explorers Baumann and Meyer arrived amidst ongoing conflicts. Upon reaching Mazinde, Semboja learned that an Arab named Abushiri was waging war in Pangani against the German East Africa Company, which was expanding its influence along the coast. Semboja, who had strong trade connections to Pangani and supported the alliance between coastal traders and inland rulers, aligned himself with Abushiri and opposed the cessation of the slave trade. In a show of support for the Abushiri campaign, Semboja confiscated 250 loads from the explorers Meyer and Baumann.

=== German Conquest and the end of the Kingdom ===
Baumann, a German explorer, played a significant role in shaping perceptions of Semboja, leading the Germans to view him as both a bandit and an adversary. From 1890 to 1895, interactions between the Germans and the Shambaa were limited. The Germans established a station at Mazinde and accepted payments for stolen goods primarily in ivory. Observing the German defeat of Abushiri, Semboja refrained from conflict, advising his son Kimweri, the king at Vugha, against war. The German station chief preferred to leave Usambara undisturbed to focus on pacifying other areas of the Protectorate. During this period, the Lutheran mission conducted significant work, relying solely on moral authority.

Beginning in 1895, Shambaa society faced a series of crises that destabilized its foundations. The troubles commenced with Semboja's natural death in March 1895. Following his passing, the Germans confiscated his arms, including 27 breechloaders, 1,300 pounds of gunpowder, and a small cannon, and swiftly subjugated the Kilindi by executing their king in front of all Kilindi chiefs. Semboja's son, Mputa, succeeded him as king but faced challenges when a commoner slept with one of his wives. Mputa ordered the man's execution, which led to his own hanging at Mazinde, an act witnessed by Kilindi chiefs, including an elderly chief brought from a distant location. This execution illustrated the German response to the Shambaa political principle that kings could only be removed by death.

After Mputa's execution, the Shambaa lost control over their political destiny. Shekulwavu's son, Kinyashi, was brought from East Usambara and installed by the Germans, but he lacked genuine power and was primarily utilized as a labor recruiter for German plantations. By 1896, Kinyashi was accepting payments for delivering workers.

The socio-economic conditions in Usambara deteriorated significantly in the late 1890s. In July 1896, a missionary noted that women in Vugha lamented, "Where once a lion sat, there is now a pig." In 1898, an outbreak of jiggers afflicted thousands, with many believing that Europeans had introduced the pestilence to torment the Shambaa. A severe famine struck Usambara in 1899, forcing people to resort to eating tree roots and banana peels, and many converted to Christianity for food. Vugha suffered extensive fires, with half of the town burning down in 1898 and the other half in 1902. Although the town had previously been rebuilt after such disasters, this time it was abandoned and ultimately disappeared. By the turn of the century, the Shambaa perceived themselves as a defeated people, facing immense hardships and loss of autonomy.

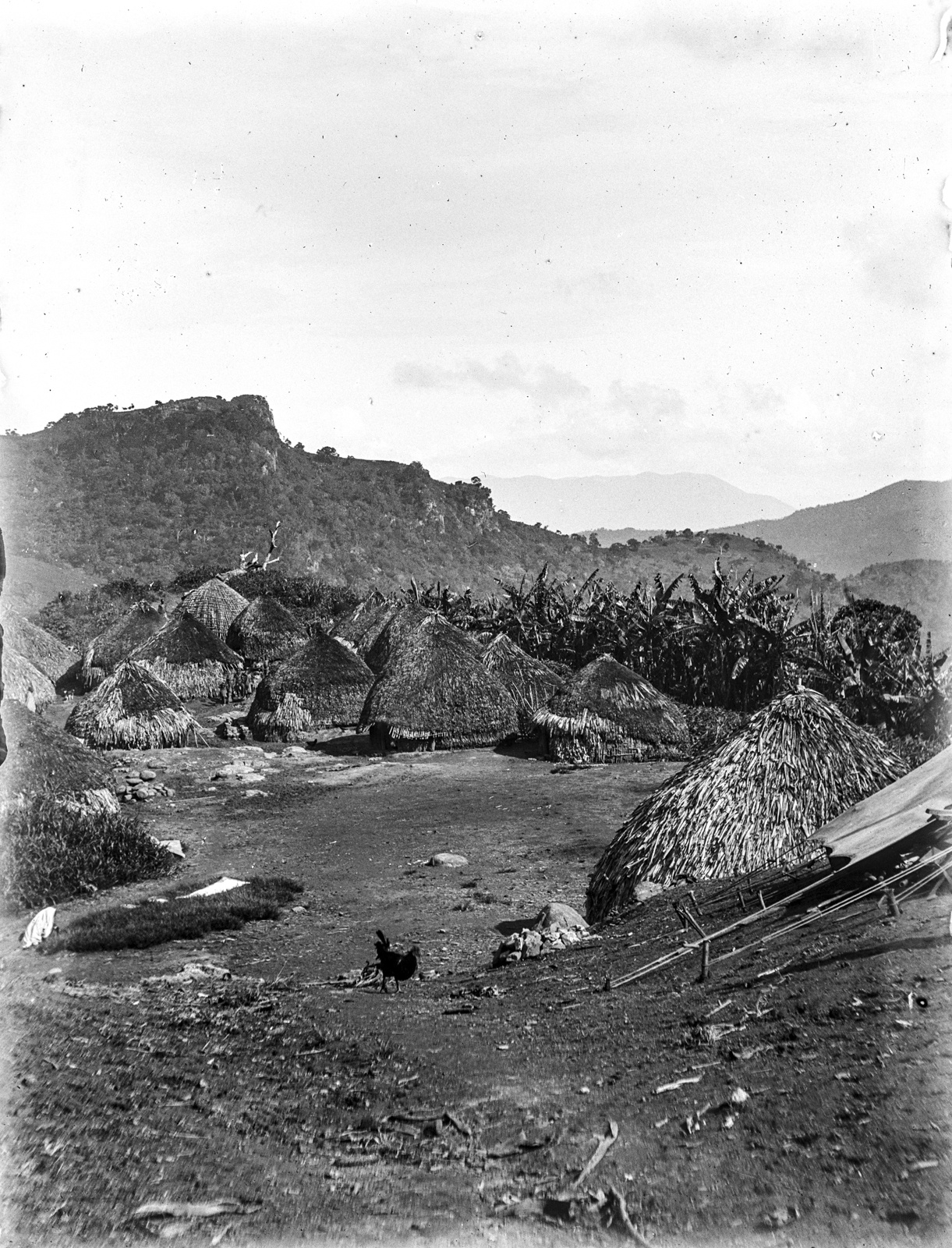
Shambaa village c.1900s. Taken by Techmer, Fritz

== Rulers ==
Based on the provided context, the succession of rulers in the Shambaa Kingdom includes the following:

- Mbegha (Founding King): established)- established the kingdom.
- Bughe (2nd King, Son of Mbegha)- Succeeded Mbegha; known for consolidating power in the Kingdom.
- Maua (Son of Mbegha): often excluded from prominent traditions, and details of his reign are limited.
- Kinyashi Muanga Ike (Son of Bughe): expanded the kingdom but faced military challenges, ultimately dying in a war against the Zigula.
- Mboza Mwaminu (Daughter of Bughe):)- Mboza Mamwinu was involved in the succession dispute following the death of her father. Her role highlights the recognition and potential influence of female leaders within the political landscape of Shambaa.
- Limo (3rd King, Son of Shembekeza woman)- during the discussions regarding succession, Limo's name emerged as a potential successor to Bughe, primarily due to the influence and pressure exerted by Mboza Mamwinu, Bughe's daughter. The elders of Vugha ultimately decided to make Limo king, a choice that was fraught with danger as it threatened the unity of the kingdom and the established order.
- Kimweri ye Nyumbai (4th King, Son of Kinyashi Muanga Ike),(died 1862, reigned 1830s-1860s) Considered the golden age of the kingdom, he consolidated power and expanded influence significantly.
- Mnkande (5th King, Son if Kimweri ye Nyumbai)- Mnkande was the heir to the throne of Vugha; however, he died some years before the death of his father, Kimweri ye Nyumbani. His death had implications for the royal lineage since it meant that the next in line for succession was his son, Shekulwavu.
- Shekulwavu (6th King, Son of Mnkande, grandson of Kimweri ye Nyumbai)- Became king during a tumultuous period marked by succession disputes and challenges to royal authority. His reign was marked by initial control over Vugha but faced challenges from rival factions and ultimately led to the decline of royal power after the burning of Vugha.
- Shemboja (7th King, Son of Kimweri ye Nyumbai) - was involved in a power struggle after his father's death. Established Mazinde as his capital. He is noted for his involvement in the slave trade during the 1870s and 1880s, which were times marked by increased violence and instability within the kingdom. He died on March 1895. The Shambaa people often attribute the turmoil of this era to the internal dynastic competition, including Shemboja's actions.
- Mputa Magogo (8th King of the Sambaa, executed by the Germans in 1895) - Mputa became king of Vugha after the death of Kimweri Maguvu. His reign was marked by a notable incident that led to his execution. In March 1895, after the death of Semboja, Mputa was found guilty of murder for exercising his royal prerogative by killing the lover of one of his wives, which was interpreted as an act of sovereignty. This act led to his trial by German authorities.
- Kimweri Maguvu (Kinyashi) (9th King, Son of Semboja) - became King after the execution of Mputa Magogo. His reign was marked by challenges, including resistance from the sons of Mnkande and the ongoing conflicts with the Bondei and Zigula, as well as the War of Mbaruk. Although he was recognized as the king, he struggled to exert full control over the various chiefdoms, many of which were ruled by his uncles and other powerful leaders.
- Kimweri Magogo (10th and last king, grandson of Mputa Magogo, born in 1914) - his reign marked the end of the traditional monarchy in the Shambaa Kingdom amidst the backdrop of colonial influence and political changes. Although his reign faced difficulties, Kimweri Magogo is recognized as the final monarch who represented the continuity of the Shambaa royal lineage before the kingdom transitioned into a new political framework influenced by colonial governance.

=== Shambaa Chiefdoms ===
The following chiefdoms were under the Shambaa Kingdom:

Northern Shambaii:

- Mlalo
- Mtii
- Mlola
- Mshihwi

Southern Shambaii:

- Bumbuli
- Shembekeza
- Mkaie-Temota
- Ubii Gare
- Bagha

== See also ==
- List of kingdoms in pre-colonial Africa
- Chagga states
