= Timeline of Tanzanian history =

This is a timeline of Tanzanian history, comprising important legal and territorial changes and political events in Tanzania and its predecessor states. To read about the background to these events, see History of Tanzania. See also the list of presidents of Tanzania.

== Early Pleistocene ==
Year	Date	Event
1.65 mya to 1.53 mya		Oldowan stone tool culture at Olduvai Gorge.

== 3rd millennium BC ==
Year	Date	Event
3000BC		Evidence of indigenous pottery and agriculture dating as far back as this period is found in the Tanzanian coast and offshore islands.

== 6th century BC ==
Year	Date	Event
600BC		International trade goods including Graeco-Roman pottery, Syrian glass vessels, Sassanian pottery from Persia and glass beads dating to this century are found at the Rufiji River delta.

== 1st century BC ==
Year	Date	Event
1000BC – 300AD		The earliest settlements in the Swahili coast appear on the archaeological record in Kwale in Kenya, Misasa in Tanzania and Ras Hafun in Somalia.

== 1st century AD ==
Year	Date	Event
~1AD – 50AD		The Periplus of the Erythrean Sea, a Graeco-Roman manuscript is written. It describes the East African coast (Azania) and an established Indian Ocean Trade route

== 2nd century AD ==
Year	Date	Event
100AD – 600AD		Centuries ahead of European metallurgists, the Haya people from the western shores of Lake Victoria manufacture carbon steel.

== 4th century AD ==
Year	Date	Event
300AD – 1000AD		Growth of Azanian and Zanj settlements in the Swahili coast. Local industry and international trade flourish.

== 7th century AD ==
Year	Date	Event
614AD – 900AD		Starting with the first Hijrah (migration) of Prophet Muhammad's followers to Ethiopia, Islam spreads across Eastern, Northern and Western Africa.
630AD – 890AD		Archaeological evidence indicates that crucible steel is manufactured at Galu, south of Mombasa. Metallurgical analysis of iron artefacts indicates that the techniques used by the inhabitants of the Swahili coast combined techniques used in other African sites as well as those in West and South Asian sites.

== 11th century ==
Year	Date	Event
1000AD – 1500AD		Emergence of the Swahili City States.
1000AD – 1200AD		The oldest Swahili texts in existence date to this period. They are written in old Swahili script (Swahili-Arabic alphabet) based on Arabic letters.

== 12th century ==
Year	Date	Event
1178–1195		Suleiman Hassan (c. 1178–1195), conquers the rival nation of Sofala.

== 14th century ==
Year	Date	Event
~1331		Moroccan explorer Ibn Battuta visits Kilwa.

== 15th century ==
Year	Date	Event
1400–1500		The ancestors of the Iraqw are credited as the builders of the Iron Age settlement at Engaruka in Northern Tanzania. Complex irrigation systems supporting intensive agriculture supported an estimated peak population of 40,000. It is recognised as the largest abandoned system of irrigated agricultural fields and terraces in sub-Saharan Africa.
1410		Kilwa's ruler makes a recorded pilgrimage to Mecca.
1498	25 February	The Portuguese explorer Vasco da Gama is the first known European to reach the East African coast, landing at Kilimane, where he stayed for 32 days.

== 16th century ==
Year	Date	Event
1505	24 July	Sack of Kilwa by the Portuguese Empire marking an end to the Kilwan golden age in the Swahili coast.
1505	August	Captain John Homere, part of Francisco de Almeida's fleet, captures the archipelago of Zanzibar, making it part of the Portuguese Empire.

== 17th century ==
Year	Date	Event
1698		Zanzibar falls under the control of the Sultan of Oman.
1698		Oman's conquest of Kilwa leds the Yao to flee to Mozambique island.
1700		Over 100,000 slaves pass through Zanzibar as part of the Arab slave trade.

== 18th century ==
Year	Date	Event
1700		The founding of the Chagga states of Kilimanjaro.
1776		Kilwa was reviving and becomes East Africa's largest slave port with the Yao returning from Mozambique as slave taders. The enslaved were sold to the French colonies of the Mascarene islands.
1776		Smallpox plagues southern Tanzania.

== 19th century ==
Year	Date	Event
1819		The Shambaa Kingdom enters a golden age under Kimweri ye Nyambai's reign.
1820		Famine in Ukerewe.
1822		United Kingdom signs the Moresby Treaty with Sultan Seyyid Said to begin the abolition of slavery in Zanzibar.
1840	December	Omani Sultan Seyyid Said moves his capital to Zanzibar City.
1842		Ngoni king Mputa Maseko arrives and settles in Songea. While Zwangendaba settles in Ufipa.
1843		The last Sultan of Kilwa is deported to Oman.
1848	11 May	German missionary Johannes Rebmann, accompanied by Johann Ludwig Krapf, become the first Europeans to report seeing Mount Kilimanjaro.
1850		The Zigua burn Saadani to the ground.
1850		Swahili is spoken widely among the Gogo and Sagara.
1855		King Muyigumba conqueres the northern and central Hehe chiefdoms into a unified Hehe state.
1856		Sultan Seyyid Said dies at sea and is succeeded by his sons Thuwaini bin Said, in Muscat and Oman and Majid bin Said, in Zanzibar.
1857	26 June	British explorers Richard Burton and John Speke travel from Zanzibar to the East African coast and begin their exploration of continental East Africa.
1857		Maize is grown in the Pangani Valley.
1858	13 February	Burton and Speke reach Lake Tanganyika, the first known Europeans to do so.
1860		King Mirambo of the Nyamwezi rises to power.
1861	2 April	Zanzibar and Oman are split into two separate principalities with Majid bin Said becoming the first Sultan of Zanzibar.
1863		Songea's king Mputa Maseko is killed by dissident Ndendeuli who flees east to the Kilombero valley and recreates Ngoni style military state forming the Mbunga people, forcing the Pogoro to flee eat to the Mahenge plateau.
1863		The French Holy Ghost Father established their first church in Zanzibar and move it to Bagamoyo in 1868.
1869		The Kiva rebellion, where Bondei rebel against the Shambaa Kingdom's rule.
1870		Islam becomes the major religion among the Zigua and Bondei.
1873		Zanzibari Sultan Barghash bin Said stops the export of slaves over the sea.
1874		Civil war in the Shambaa Kingdom turns Pangani into a rival slave port to Bagamoyo and Kilwa.
1875		Bagamoyo pays tribute to the Zaramo fearing attack.
1875		The Mbugu of Gare kill a Kilindi royal in rebellion.
1876		Barghash bin Said closes Zanzibar's slave market.
1876		Kilwa's biggest export switches from slaves to wild rubber.
1878		The Hehe and Ngoni go to war with the Invasion of Mshope by the Hehe.
1880		Fipa King Kapufi of Nkasi hires an Arab Prime minister in his court.
1881		The Pare at Mbaga attack a slave trader settlement of Kisiwani.
1882		The Ngoni and Hehe end their war with Bena partitioned amongst them as a buffer.
1882		King Songea Mbano of the Ngoni raids the eastern stateless peoples like the Ngindo, Makonde and Mwera forcing them to flee further eastwards leaving empty land.
1884	28 March	The Society for German Colonization is formed by Karl Peters in order to acquire German colonial territories in overseas countries. Peters signs treaties with several native chieftains on the mainland opposite Zanzibar.
1884	23 November	The Germans led by Peters land at Saadani and start the invasion reaching the Ngulu mountains and signing a sham treaty with Chief Mafungu Biniani of Ngulu .
1884	2 December	Mirambo of the Nyamwezi empire dies.
1885	3 March	The German government announces its intention to establish a protectorate in East Africa.
1885	2 April	The German East Africa Company is formed by Karl Peters to govern German East Africa.
1886	1 November	An agreement is reached between Britain and Germany designating a 10-mile (16 km) wide strip of land along the coast as being controlled by Sultan Barghash bin Said, along with Zanzibar, Pemba, and Mafia. The area that is to become Tanganyika is assigned to Germany while the area to become Kenya is assigned to Britain.
1887	25 May	The Germans occupy Dar es Salaam.
1887		The Zaramo attack two German stations in Dar es Salaam .
1888	April	The German East Africa Company leases the coastal strip opposite Zanzibar from Sultan Khalifah bin Said for 50 years.
1888		The Zigua boycott a station in Old Korogwe.
1888	September	Tanga is bombed by German warships.
1889	June	Germans capture Saadani after fierce fighting Bwana Heri flees inland .
1889	July	Germans capture Pangani after heavy shelling from the sea.
1889	15 December	Germans hang Abushiri .
1890	1 July	The Heligoland–Zanzibar Treaty makes Zanzibar and Pemba a British protectorate.
1890	1 August	The Sultan of Zanzibar signs an anti-slavery decree.
1890	1 May	Germans bombard Kilwa for three days into submission.
1891	February	The Battle of Kibosho.
1891	November	Mangi Rindi dies.
1896	27 August	The Anglo-Zanzibar War is fought between Zanzibar and the United Kingdom. It lasted approximately 38 minutes and is the shortest war in history.
1896	November	The Germans and Chagga sack Meru.
1897	5 April	Sultan Hamoud bin Mohammed issues a decree making slavery illegal in Zanzibar.
1897		Mangi Sina dies.
1898	19 July	Following years of resistance, Chief Mkwawa of the Hehe is cornered by German soldiers and commits suicide in lieu of capture.
1898		Katukamoto of Urambo, who was held accountable for the murder of an askari, was imprisoned. Following this event, the remnants of Mirambo's empire were systematically dismantled.

== 20th century ==
Year	Date	Event
1900	2 March	Great Hanging at Old Moshi was a mass execution of 19 Chagga and Meru leaders together with their noblemen by German colonial officers.
1905	July	The Maji Maji Rebellion starts as a violent resistance to colonial rule in Tanganyika.
1907	August	The Maji Maji Rebellion ends, leaving between 200,000 and 300,000 rebels dead.
1914	8 August	The East African Campaign of the First World War begins.
1914	3 November	The Battle of Tanga, the first major military engagement of the First World War, takes place. (to 5 November)
1916	4 September	Dar es Salaam is occupied by troops from the United Kingdom and South Africa.
1919	28 June	Following the First World War, the Treaty of Versailles divides German East Africa, with the United Kingdom acquiring the largest section which it names the Tanganyika Territory.
1920		Sir Horace Byatt is appointed the first governor of Tanganyika.
1920	10 January	The British mandate over Tanganyika comes into force.
1929		The Tanganyika African Association is founded by members of the Tanganyika Territory African Civil Service association.
1946	13 December	British mandate over Tanganyika is converted to a United Nations Trusteeship.
1954	9 June	Germany returns the skull of Hehe chief Mkwawa (died 1898) to Tanzania and it is put on display near Iringa.
1954	7 July	Julius Nyerere forms the Tanganyika African National Union (TANU) and becomes its first president.
1961	October	The University College, Dar es Salaam is established as one of three constituent colleges of the University of East Africa, with 14 law students.
1961	9 December	Tanganyikan independence; Julius Nyerere as Prime Minister.
1961	14 December	Tanganyika becomes a member of the United Nations.
1962	22 January	Julius Nyerere resigns as Prime Minister and is succeeded by Rashidi Kawawa.
1962	9 December	Tanganyika becomes a republic with Julius Nyerere as its first president.
1963	16 December	Zanzibar becomes a member of the United Nations.
1963	19 December	Zanzibar receives independence from the United Kingdom, becoming a constitutional monarchy.
1964	12 January	The Zanzibar Revolution by local Africans overthrows the Sultan of Zanzibar and his primarily Arab government. Sheikh Abeid Karume becomes the first President of Zanzibar.
1964	26 April	The Republic of Tanganyika and the Republic of Zanzibar and Pemba unite to form the United Republic of Tanganyika and Zanzibar.
1964	1 November	The United Republic of Tanganyika and Zanzibar changes its name to the United Republic of Tanzania.
1965	21 September	President Nyerere is returned to power in a one-party election.
1965	1 October	Nyerere is sworn in for his second presidential term.
1967	5 February	President Nyerere issues the Arusha Declaration, outlining the principles of Ujamaa.
1969	24 September	The Arusha Agreement is signed between the European Union and the East African states of Kenya, Tanzania, and Uganda.
1970	1 July	Tanzania's first university, the University of Dar es Salaam is founded from the split of the University of East Africa into three national universities.
1971	1 January	The Arusha Agreement is enacted.
1972	7 April	Vice President Abeid Karume is assassinated in Zanzibar Town.
1972	11 April	Aboud Jumbe becomes the second President of Zanzibar and Vice President of Tanzania.
1976		Archaeologist Mary Leakey and her team discover homoinid fossil footprints at Laetoli, south of the Olduvai Gorge.
1977	5 February	Tanganyika African National Union (TANU) and Zanzibar's Afro-Shirazi Party merge to become Chama Cha Mapinduzi (CCM).
1977	18 April	The border between Tanzania and Kenya is closed.
1977	25 April	The constitution of Tanzania is adopted.
1978	27 October	Ugandan forces under Idi Amin invade Tanzania, starting the Uganda–Tanzania War, also known as the Liberation War.
1979	11 April	Tanzanian troops capture the Ugandan capital of Kampala, heralding the end of the Uganda–Tanzania War and Amin's regime.
1983		Tanzania's first AIDS diagnosis is made in Bukoba district, Kagera Region.
1983	17 November	The Tanzania–Kenya border reopens.
1984	31 January	Ali Hassan Mwinyi is sworn in as the third President of Zanzibar and Vice President of Tanzania.
1985	5 November	Julius Nyerere retires and Ali Hassan Mwinyi becomes the second President of Tanzania. Mwinyi is succeeded as vice president by Joseph Sinde Warioba.
1990	October	Ali Hassan Mwinyi wins a single-party election with 95.5% of the vote and is sworn in for a second presidential term.
1992	28 May	The Civic United Front is formed.
1995	29 October	Tanzania holds its first multi-party election.
1995	23 November	Benjamin Mkapa is sworn in as the third President of Tanzania.
1973	February	The Tanzanian parliament moves from Dar es Salaam to the new capital of Dodoma.
1998	7 August	The United States embassies in Dar es Salaam, Tanzania and Nairobi, Kenya are simultaneously bombed.
1999	14 October	Julius Nyerere dies of leukaemia in London.
1999	30 November	The East African Community Treaty between Kenya, Tanzania, and Uganda is signed in Arusha.
2000	7 July	The East African Community Treaty comes into force.
2000	29 October	Benjamin Mkapa is re-elected as President of Tanzania, with 72 percent of the vote.

== 21st century ==
Year	Date	Event
2001	28 January	Demonstrators in Zanzibar protesting the 2000 elections, clash with police and 32 people are killed.
2001	5 July	Ali Mohamed Shein becomes Vice President of Tanzania.
2001	December	The government controversially decides to spend £28m on a new air traffic control system.
2002	24 June	The Igandu train disaster kills more than 200 people and is Tanzania's worst train crash.
2002	July	Mkapa's government is criticized for purchasing a £15m presidential jet shortly before reaching an agreement with the UK for £270m in aid.
2003	December	The Kipunji, a new species of monkey, is found in Tanzania—the first new African monkey species since 1974. It is also independently discovered in July 2004.
2005	14 December	General elections are held. Anna Senkoro of the Progressive Party of Tanzania–Maendeleo is the first woman in Tanzania to run for president.
2005	21 December	Jakaya Kikwete is sworn in as the fourth President of Tanzania.
2005	30 December	Edward Lowassa is sworn is as Prime Minister.
2006	11 May	Scientists announce that the Kipunji monkey found in 2003 belongs to a new genus of African monkey—the first to be discovered since 1923.
2006	9 August	$642m of Tanzania's debt is cancelled by the African Development Bank.
2008	6 February	A parliamentary committee reports on corruption within the cabinet.
2008	7 February	Prime Minister Edward Lowassa and two other ministers resign following the report on corruption. President Kikwete dissolves the cabinet.
2021	17 March	John Magufuli, President of Tanzania, dies.
2021	19 March	Samia Suluhu Hassan is sworn in as Tanzania's first female President.

== See also ==
- Timeline of Dar es Salaam
- Timeline of Zanzibar City

== Notes ==
1. Sources vary as to the exact timescale of the migration of Khoisan from Southern Africa. Nurse & Spear say "as long as twenty thousand years ago".
2. The Bantu expansion from West Africa likely happened in several stages. Sources vary as to the exact timescale of the arrival of Bantu people to East Africa. Nurse & Spear say from "twenty-five hundred years ago". Ndembwike says 100–200 AD.
3. Several durations are given by sources, including 38, 40 and 45 minutes, but the 38 minute duration is the most often quoted. The variation is due to confusion over what actually constitutes the start and end of a war. Some sources take the start of the war as the order to open fire at 09:00 and some with the start of actual firing at 09:02. The end of the war is usually put at 09:40 when the last shots were fired and the palace flag struck, but some sources place it at 09:45. The logbooks of the British ships also suffer from this with St George indicating that cease-fire was called and Khalid entered the German consulate at 09:35, Thrush at 09:40, Racoon at 09:41 and Philomel and Sparrow at 09:45.
4. There is no exact figure for the number of deaths in the Maji Maji Rebellion. German officials at the time estimated 75,000. Most sources say over 200,000.

== Bibliography ==
- Institut für Afrika-Kunde; Rolf Hofmeier, eds. (1990). "Tanzania". Afrika Jahrbuch 1989 (in German). Germany: Leske + Budrich. doi:10.1007/978-3-322-92639-5. ISBN 978-3-8100-0831-2. OCLC 19093344. "Politik, Wirtschaft und Gesellschaft in Afrika südlich der Sahara"
- "Tanzania". Political Chronology of Africa. Political Chronologies of the World. Europa Publications. 2001. p. 423+. ISBN 0203409957.
- Kurt Hirschler; Rolf Hofmeier (2013). "Tanzania". In Andreas Mehler; et al. (eds.). Africa Yearbook: Politics, Economy and Society South of the Sahara in 2012. Vol. 9. Koninklijke Brill. p. 401+. ISBN 9789004256002. ISSN 1871-2525.
