= Mbegha =

Lion King of the Shambaa people

- Simba Mwene, King of Usambara
- Reign: c.1730s-1750s
- Predecessor: New Dynasty
- Successor: Buge
- Born: Mbegha c.1700s Nguru Mountains, Tanga Region, Tanzania
- Died: c.1750s Vugha, Bumbuli, Tanga Region, Tanzania
- Issue: Buge
- Dynasty: Kilindi

Mbegha (c. 1700s – c.1750s), also known as Simbe Mwene, (Mwene Mbegha in Shamabaa), (Mfalme Mbegha, in Swahili) was the first king also known the "Lion King" ( Simba Mwene in Kisambaa) of the Shambaa people, in modern-day western Tanga Region of Tanzania. King Mbegha lived during the first half of the 18th century. While his existence is undisputed among historians, his biography is mainly based on oral traditions. Numerous legends have made him a mythic hero.

== Origins ==
Mbegha was born to the Ngulu people from the hilly area of the Nguru Mountains in modern day Kilindi District of Tanga Region. Because of disputes with relatives and because it was considered supernaturally dangerous, he was condemned from his homeland. He fled to northern Kilindi, where he became a hunter, hunting bush pigs with the local chief's son. While on a hunt, the chief's son was accidentally killed. In order to escape punishment from the chief, Mbegha had to flee again, this time further northeast into the Usambara Mountains. He lived in the open near a place called Ziai, in caves and camps, hunting wild animals.

Upon learning that Mbegha was a skilled pig hunter, the Shambaa people asked him to rid their village of pigs, which kept on destroying their agricultural produce. He killed all pigs and was welcomed by the Shambaa. He was invited to live in Vugha, near modern-day Bumbuli, then chief town of the Shambaa people. Mbegha also helped the people of Vugha and all the other villages and was awarded with the kingship. He became known as a lion slayer after killing a lion on the way to their village. The grateful farmers gave him wives from each major clan and the respective firstborn sons were placed in charge of all clans, thereby also forging regional unity forming the first Shambaa kingdom with Mbegha as their king.

== Legacy ==
Mbegha was the founder of the Kilindi dynasty. Mbegha's son Buge grew to become the chief of Vugha and when Mbegha died, Buge succeeded him as king. Buge's son Kimweri ye Nyumbai ruled the kingdom at its greatest extent starting in 1815. After he died in1862, there was a succession struggle amongst his relatives, and in 1890 Germany began to colonise the former kingdom.

== See also ==
- History of Tanzania
