= Kilindi dynasty =

Royal family from Tanga Region, Tanzania

House of Kilindi Boma la Kilindi (Swahili) Kilindi dynasty
- Origin: Vugha
- Founded: 1730 AD (295–296 years ago)
- Founder: Mbegha
- Final ruler: Kimweri Mputa Magogo
- Titles: Simbe Mwene (Lion King); Kimweri; Mflame; Malkia; Sultan
- Deposition: 1862

The Kilindi dynasty(c. 1790s – 1862), (Mwene Kilindi in Shamabaa), (Boma la Kilindi, in Swahili) was a pre-colonial, Tanzanian royal family that has reigned over the Shambaa people of north-west Tanga Region for most of the 18th to 20th centuries. The region is in the modern-day Lushoto District and Bumbuli Districtof Tanazania.

The dynasty was founded by king Mbegha, who settled in the Usambara Mountains and united the Shambaa people in the first half of the 18th century. Its most prominent member was king Kimweri ye Nyumbai, who died in 1862. The Kilindi kings of the Shambaa were known as Simba Mwene, which means Lion King. The last Lion King to be recognized as having authority was Kimweri Mputa Magogo (1914–2000). The Kilindi District of Tanga was named after the famous ruling dynasty.

== History ==
The founder of the dynasty was Mbegha, and his son Bughe established the hilltop capital at Vuga, Korogwe district. The kingdom reached its greatest extent under Kimweri ye Nyumbai. After he died in 1862, a civil war broke out over the succession, fueled by competition for the new wealth that the caravan trade in the Pangani valley had brought to the region.

Under colonial rule (first German then British) the dynasty continued to have some authority, but in 1962 the Tanzanian government removed all power from the hereditary chiefdoms. Kimweri ye Nyumbai's descendant Kimweri Mputa Magogo, who died in 2000, was the last Lion King.

== Family members ==
- Mbegha (18th century)
- Kimweri ye Nyumbai (died 1862)
- Kimweri Mputa Magogo (1914–2000)

== Literature ==
- Feierman, Steven M. (1990). Peasant Intellectuals: Anthropology and History in Tanzania. Univ of Wisconsin Press. ISBN 978-0-299-12523-3.
- Giblin, James Leonard (1992). The Politics of Environmental Control in Northeastern Tanzania, 1840-1940. University of Pennsylvania Press. ISBN 978-0-8122-3177-9.
- Iliffe, John (10 May 1979). A Modern History of Tanganyika. Cambridge University Press. p. 65. ISBN 978-0-521-29611-3.
