= Kitivo =

Village in the Tanga Region of Tanzania

- Location in Tanzania
- Coordinates: 04°30′S 38°23′E
- Country: Tanzania
- Region: Tanga Region
- District: Lushoto District
- Time zone: UTC+3 (East Africa Time)
- Website: District website

Kitivo is a small village in Lushoto District in the Tanga Region of Tanzania.

== Kitivo Secondary School ==
Located in the village is a secondary school, partnered with Bramhall High School in England.

For the last few years, Bramhall High School students have raised money to help the students and teachers in Kitivo.

=== School life ===
In 1973 the school built a basic girls' hostel with help from Bramhall High to accommodate 700 girls during the school year. Kitivo Secondary received a few old computers as a donation from Bramhall High. However, only a few laptops can be used at the same time due to a lack of power at the school. Bramhall High organized a sponsored walk to Lyme Park and back, covering a distance of about 10 kilometers. The goal was to raise £30,000 to help pay for a solar cell, a toilet block, and a kitchen.

Attending Kitivo Secondary School costs £100 per year, a significant amount for local families. School meals cost £50 per term.

Over the years, the region has experienced dramatic climate change. Now the ambient temperature can reach 50 °C, affecting the children attending school. Water scarcity due to evaporation has become a major issue, with most of the water left being contaminated by insects.
