= Kimweri ye Nyumbai =

King of the Shambaa 1815-1862

Kimweri ya Nyumbai

King of Usambara
- Reign: 1815 – 1862
- Predecessor: Kinyashi Muanga Ike
- Successor: Shekulwavu II
- Born: c.1790s Bumbuli District
- Died: 1862
- Issue (among others): Semboja
Names
- Shkulwavu Kimweri ya Nyumbai Kinyashi
- Dynasty: Kilindi
- Father: Shebughe Kinyashi Muaga Ike
- Religion: Traditional African religions

Kimweri ya Nyumbai or Shekulwavu Kimweri ya Nyumabi (c. 1790s – 1862), also known as (Simbe Mwene), (Simbe Mwene Shekulwavu Kimweri ya Nyumbai in Shambaa), (Mfalme Kimweri, in Swahili) was the King of the Shambaa people in the Shambaa Kingdom of the Usambara Mountains in what is now Tanga Region of Tanzania between around 1815 and 1862. Under his rule the kingdom reached its greatest extent. However, disruptions caused by the introduction of firearms and the slave trade caused the kingdom to fall apart after his death. (Note: In the Kilindi dynasty the Kings alternately took the formal names Shebughe and Shekulwavu. They were known by nicknames. Thus "Kimweri ye Nyumbai" means "Kimweri Stay-at-Home". His true name was Shekulwavu. His father, Shebughe, was called "Kinyashi Muanga Ike", meaning "Kinyashi Who Walks Alone".)

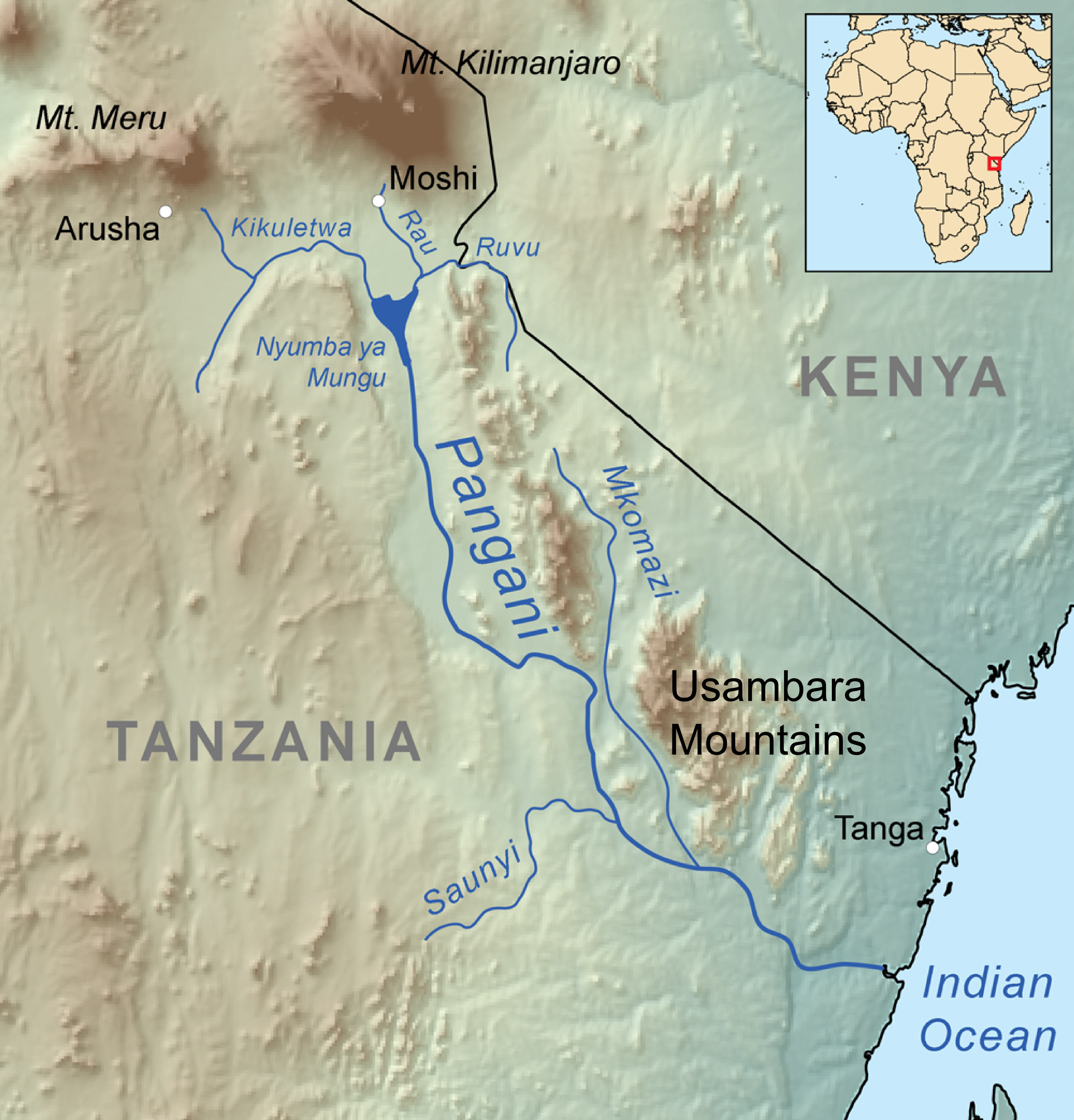
East Africa showing location of the Usambara Mountains, lower right. The northern tip of Zanzibar is just visible in the extreme lower right

== Background ==
Kimweri ye Nyumbai belonged to the Kilindi dynasty, founded by his great paternal grandfather Mbegha. According to legend, Mbegha was a hunter who was cast out from the Nguu to live in the Usambara rain forest, where he killed wild pigs for food. The Shambaa were impressed by his prowess and accepted him as ruler of the town of Vuga, their capital in the western Usambara mountains founding the Kilindi dynasty and the Shambaa Kingdom.

The Kilindi rulers took the title "Simbe Mwene", meaning, the Lion King in Kisambaa. Mbegha was succeeded by his son Bughe, who was succeeded by his son Kinyashi, Kimweri's father. Kinyashi strengthened the kingdom's political and military organisation in response to raids from slavers and cattle raiders. He conquered the Wazigua country to the south in the lower Pangani River valley, and of the eastern Usambara mountains, nearer to the coast.

The expanding East African slave trade in the 19th century was controlled by the Omani Arabs, whose sultan had moved his capital to the island of Zanzibar. The route from the port of Pangani at the mouth of the Pangani River to the Usambara Mountains and Mount Kilimanjaro was one of the most important of the trade routes across Tanganyika, along which enslaved people and ivory were brought to the coast in exchange for cotton cloth and guns. Kimweri ya Nyumbai was the Kilindi leader at a time when his people were taking control of the trade on behalf of the Arabs.

== Reign ==
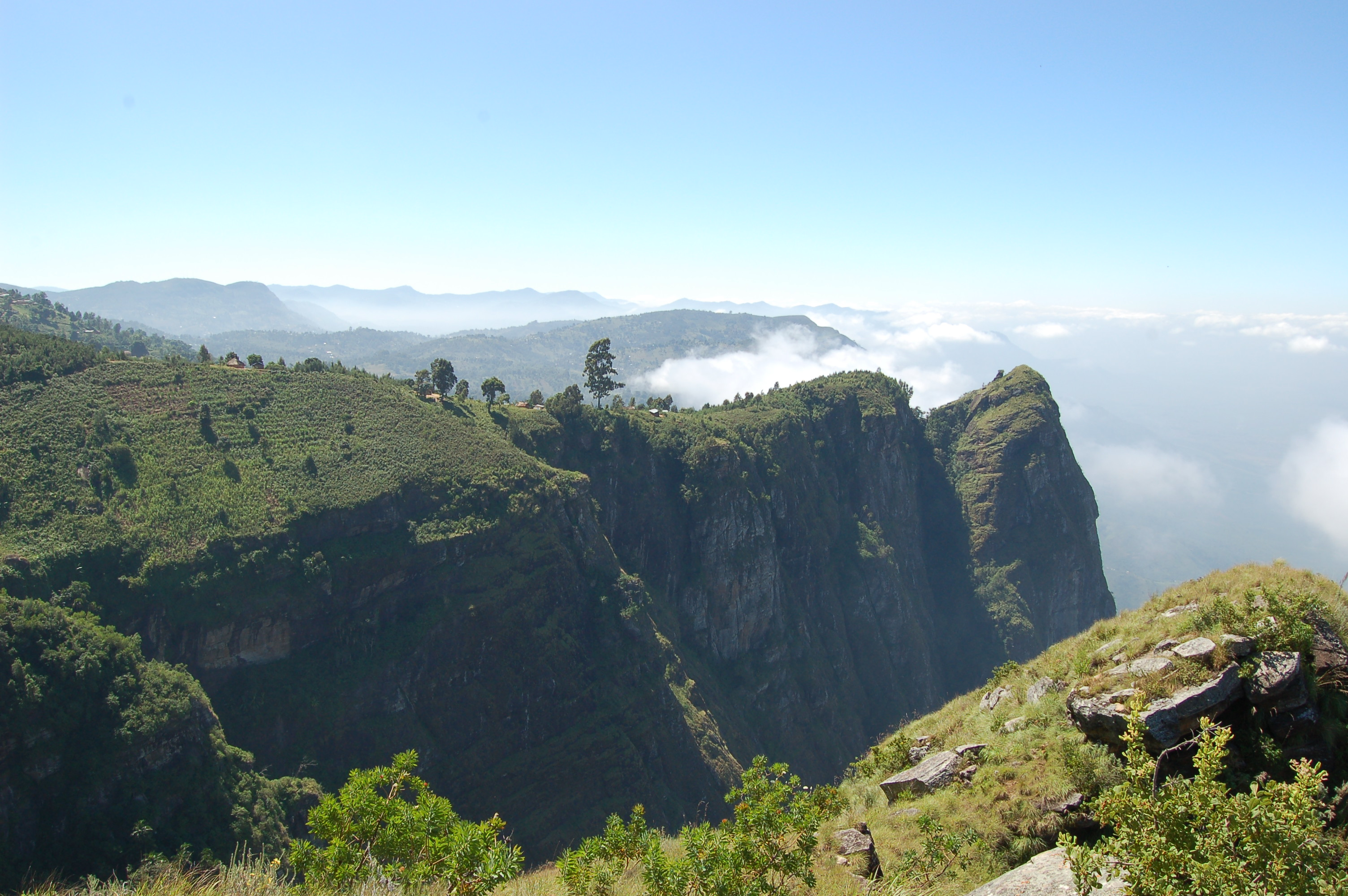
Usambara Mountains, Tanzania

The Shambaa kingdom reached its greatest strength during the reign of Kimweri ye Nyumbani. He expanded the kingdom, and by 1835 controlled all of the coastline below the Usambaras. He ruled from the hilltop town of Vugha in modern-day Bumbuli District that contained about 500,000 people.

His realm stretched from the mountains to the coastal region between Tanga and Pangani, and into the plains to the south and east. An 1853 report said of the island settlements in the Pangani River that "the Wasegua [Zigula] have settled here [on these islands] in this fruitful region by the permission of Chief Kimweri".

Kimweri was said to have 300 wives, and the capital was surrounded by villages holding his wives and dependents. He had a great many children, and installed them in place of most of the local chiefs. As a result, the kingdom was relatively peaceful, with Kimweri ultimately able to overrule unjust decisions by his sons. However, after his death the effect was that the king faced challenges from his brothers.

=== Tribute and trade ===
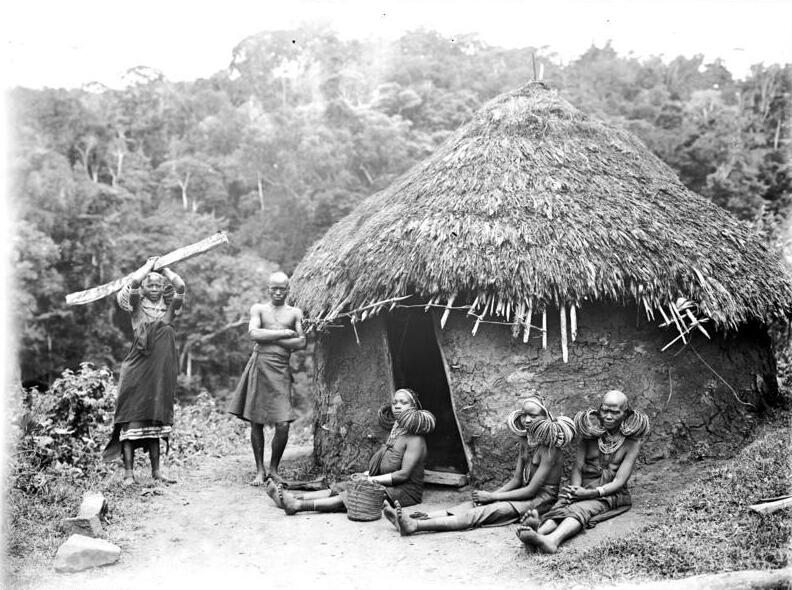
Shambaa people in the early 20th century

Kimweri ye Nyumbai was visited by the missionary Johann Ludwig Krapf in 1848 and again in 1852. Krapf said he was hospitable to strangers, and was an effective ruler. In 1852 Krapf saw Kimweri's collectors extracting tribute from the loosely controlled coastal region, then taking them back to Vugha where the spoils were divided. Of 200 pieces of cloth, considered to be wealth equivalent to livestock, Kimweri ye Nyumbai took 100 cloths, the collectors took 42, and non-Kilindi officials divided up the remainder. It was in their interest for Kimweri to be strong enough to obtain tribute.

Krapf said that the governor of Pangani paid 200 yards (180 m) of Lowell sheeting to Kimweri as tribute. This was cotton cloth from the Lowell Mills of the United States, which could be adapted as clothing, used for sails or for funeral winding sheets. Beads, cloth, knives, brass wire and other items imported from the coast became a form of currency.

The people in the newly subjected eastern part of the kingdom were subject to harsher rule than in the west. The local chiefs were more likely to enslave their people and seize their property. Rebellion against Kilindi control or failure to pay tribute were common. Witches, rebels and prisoners of war could be sold to coastal traders, usually in exchange for arms and ammunition. Later in his reign Kimweri ye Nyumbai's decreed that major thieves could also be sold. Johann Jakob Erhardt, who visited Vugha in September 1853, saw two witches brought in and executed. Their wealth and dependents were taken.

=== Conflict with neighbours ===
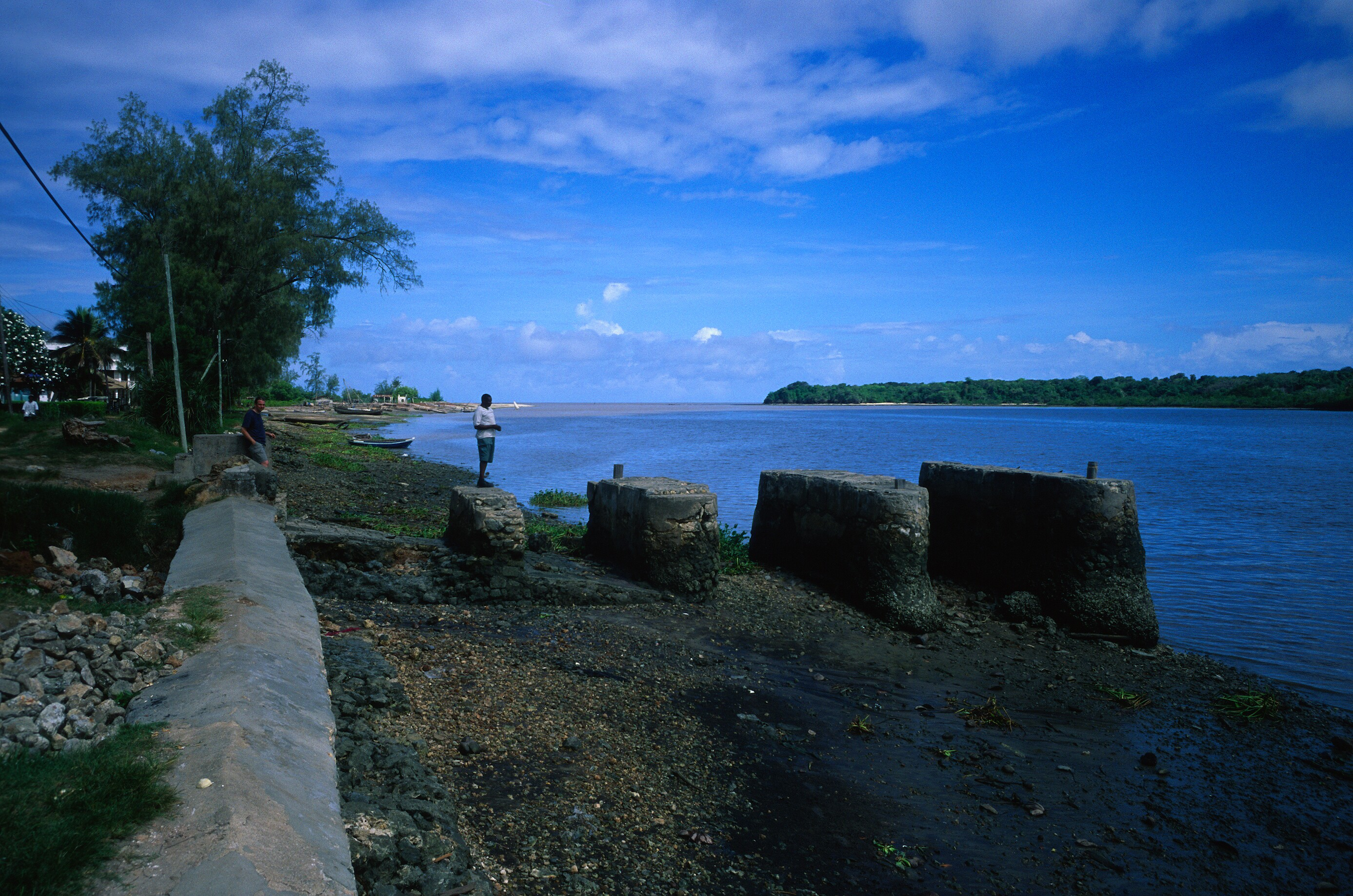
Mouth of the Pangani River in 2006

At first Kimweri, ruling an isolated and conservative state, did not appreciate the value of firearms. They were unknown in the reign of his father. In the 1830s the Zigula people obtained arms and used them to take control of the Pangani River valley. Starting in the 1840s there was a dramatic rise in the number of flintlock muskets and gunpowder imported into the region, and Kimweri was actively competing for these weapons with other local rulers.

The kingdom was attacked by Maasai raiders from the north, but they do not seem to have penetrated into the lower Pangani. Erhardt recorded the repulse of a Maasai raid in 1853 at Mazinde by an allied army of Shambaa under Semboja, Kimweri's son, and of Wazigua, Parakuyo and "Arabs" (most likely Swahili). The growth of trade in ivory and slaves led to a conflict in 1853 with the Sultan of Zanzibar, Seyyid Said.The two rulers reached an agreement under which they had a form of joint sovereignty over the coastal region, and Kimweri assumed the title of Sultan.

Sultan Seyyid Said of Zanzibar traded with both the Zigua and the Shambaa Kingdom under Kimweri

By the 1850s the caravans from the coast were avoiding the lower Pangani basin, which was unsafe due to Zigua raiders, and were taking a route to the north of the Usambaras. Sultan Seyyid Said had a profitable agreement with the Zigua by which they supplied large quantities of slaves, ivory and grain. Kimweri offered Mount Tongwe, in a strategic position in this area, to Krapf as the site for a mission station. Around 1853 Sultan Seyyid Said built a fort on Mount Tongwe. It has been speculated that Kimweri invited first Krapf and then Seyyid Said to occupy the site as a way of disrupting the better-armed Ziguas' "mythical center of power... from which the Zigua drew inspirations."

=== Last years ===
The explorers Richard Burton and John Hanning Speke visited Vuga in 1857, passing through local markets where villagers traded their produce. Burton wrote: "The war-horn is now silent, and the watch-fire never leaves the mountain." Burton described Kimweri,

Kimweri half rose from his cot as we entered, and motioned us to sit upon dwarf stools before him. He was an old, old man, emaciated by sickness. His head was shaved, his face beardless, and wrinkled like grandam's; his eyes were red, his jaws disfurnished, and his hands and feet were stained with leprous spots. The royal dress was a Surat cap, much the worse for wear, and a loinwrap as tattered. He was covered with a double cotton cloth, and he rested upon a Persian rug, apparently coeval with himself. The hut appeared that of a simple cultivator, but it was redolent of dignitaries, some fanning the Sultan, others chatting, and all holding long-stemmed pipes with small ebony bowls.

Kimweri died a few years later, in 1862.

== Aftermath ==
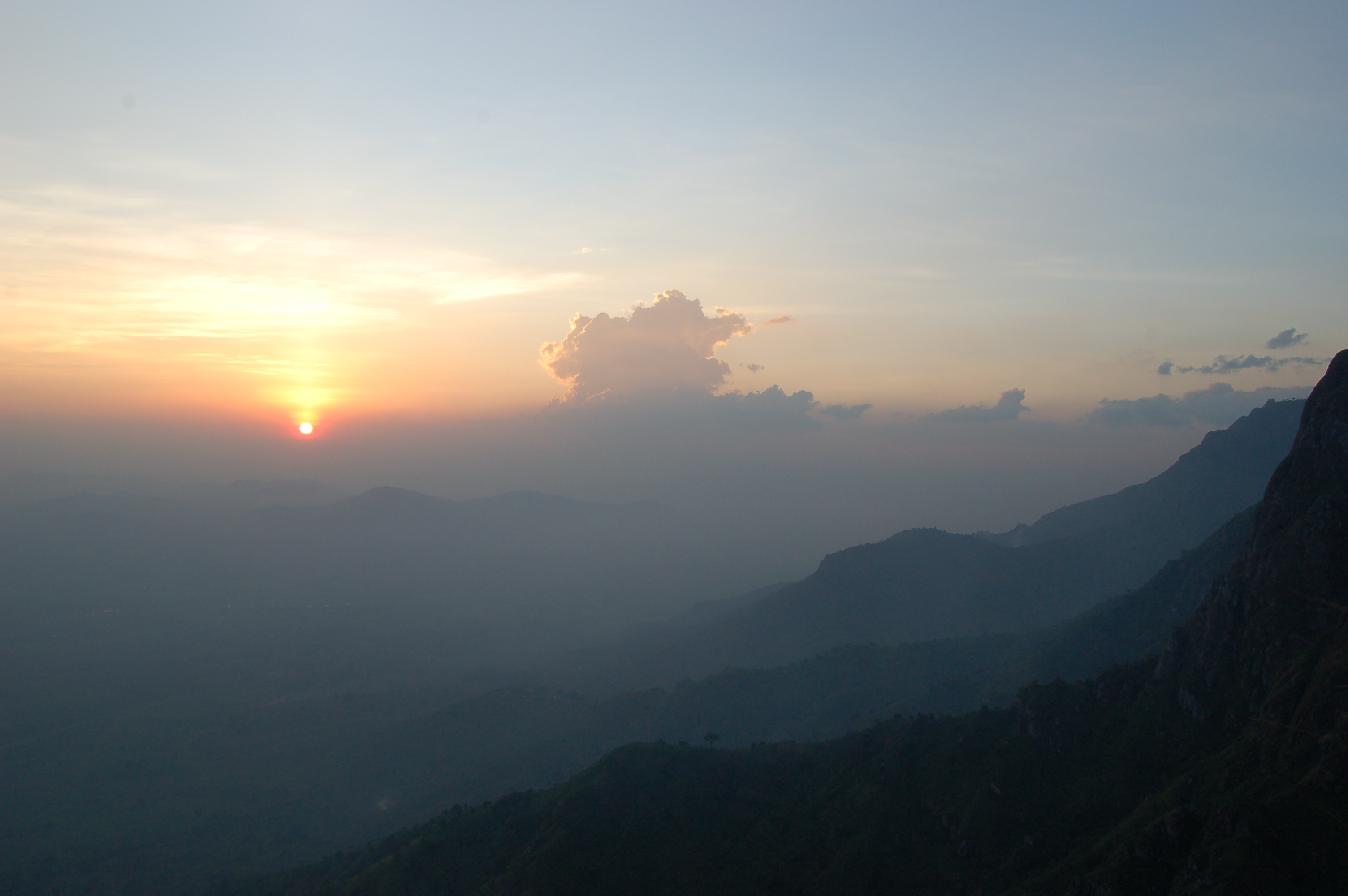
Usambara Mountains

After Kimweri ye Nyumbai died a civil war broke out over the succession, fueled by competition for the new wealth that the caravan trade in the Pangani valley had brought to the region. Smallpox and slave trading contributed to the disintegration of the kingdom, and in 1898 a fire destroyed Vugha.

The Shambaa people played an important role in the Abushiri uprising in 1888–89, but finally yielded to the Germans in 1898. Under colonial rule the dynasty continued to have some authority, but in 1962 the Tanzanian government removed all power from the hereditary chiefdoms. Kimweri ye Nyumbai's descendant Kimweri Mputa Magogo (died 2000) was the last Lion King.

== Legacy ==
The burial sites of Kimwere's grandson, Kipondo, and granddaughter, Chonge, were treated as sacred sites as late as 1984. Ceremonies held at these sites may help overcome problems such as shortage of rain. However, these beliefs are fading with the growing influence of Islam and Christianity.

In retrospect, the reign of Kimweri came to be seen as a golden age. It was said of him:

Kimweri ye Nyumbai placed sons in the chiefdoms, and he was respected... in those days there was nothing but peace and good will in the land... Such peace is not seen in the days of every king. It was seen in the days of Kimweri, because if a person had no wealth, if his wife's lineage was about to take her from him, he could say, "Oh king, my wife is being taken." Kimweri would say, "Go to the following place. There is a cow of mine which you may take." He didn't like to be told, "This is the son of so and so." He liked to say, "They are all my children." And when he sent a son to rule, he would say, "You are to build a village, and live nicely with your companions, so that there is no conflict. In judging cases, show an evil man his own evil. But if there is a man with no evil, don't introduce evil into his life."
