= Shambaa =

Shambaa may be:

- Shambaa people
- Shambala language
