= Vugha =

National Historic Site of Tanzania

Vuga
- Location within Tanzania
- 4°54′17.64″S 38°20′42″E
- Type: Settlement
- Cultures: Shambaa
- Location: Bumbuli District, Tanga Region, Tanzania

History
- Built: 18th century CE

Site notes
- Condition: Endangered
- Owner: Tanzanian Government
- Management: Antiquities Division, Ministry of Natural Resources and Tourism

National Historic Sites of Tanzania
- Official name: Vugha Historic Settlement
- Type: Cultural

Vugha or Vuga (Mji wa kale wa Vuga in Swahili ) is a historic village located inside Bumbuli District of Tanga Region in Tanzania. The settlement was established as the capital of the Kilindi dynasty's Shambaa Kingdom.

== History ==
The Shambaa first established a number of small clan chiefdoms, but they were imperiled by Mbugu, an influx of Cushitic pastoralists whose tribal institutions clashed with the local cultivators' structure. Tradition holds that Mbegha, a traveling hunter from Ungulu, was the old culture's savior. He subdued the Shambaa by using force, guile, diplomacy, and marriage into powerful families. His empire was a living example of the previous way of life. Vugha, the royal capital, was created as a sizable Shambaa town and was thought to have 3,000 residents in 1857. The state was founded on kinship.

The Shambaa monarchy at first aimed to undermine the strength and morality of the clans, but lineages arbitrated internal conflicts and assumed collective responsibility for their members. The Kilindi, a royal descending clan descended from Mbegha's Shambaa wives, were associated with the governmental system. Their maternal uncles, who were commoners, held the sub-chiefs of the Kilindi in check.

A council of commoners served the king. Life and death were in his exclusive hands. He had the authority to take things without paying for them and ladies without bridewealth. He collected tribute and gave it to his operatives. Only he had mastery over rain-making. The populace cried out at his official coronation, "You are our King, but if you don't treat us right, we will get rid of you." The distinction between Shambaa and stranger, hill and plain, farm and forest, and civic society, however, would not exist without him. The Shambaa's kingdom, which was the pinnacle of the Bantu-speaking peoples of Tanganyika's civilisation, was the result of intercultural mingling.

The British rediscovered the Shambaa Kingdom in 1925. Since Kinyashi's abdication in 1902, akidas had taken the place of the Shambaa kingdom's institutions. The rains stopped and a lion entered Vugha for the first time in a long time prior to Kinyashi's return to power in 1926, but to reconstruct the Shambaa state also meant to repeat the wars that had brought about "the time of rapacity." The kingdom's difficult power relations were the one thing that was unquestionably conventional about it.

Only one of the groups that fought for Kimweri ya Nyumbai's inheritance was represented by Kinyashi. He was an old, feeble, introverted, and superstitious man who was scared of witchcraft, persuaded that Vugha would kill him just as it had killed his father and grandfather, and who was so aware that he was in power because of British favor that he kept his pay in order to return it when he was overthrown.

He abdicated again in 1929, and the British went to the opposing faction to install two of Semboja's grandchildren in succession. Additionally, the previous argument about the degree of the king's authority over regional sub-chiefs was brought back by the kingdom's reconstruction. After twelve years of struggle, the district office finally agreed with him that "the chief and elders [of Vugha]...have the right to turn out an unsuitable sub-chief" and removed the sub-chief of the long-independent Mlalo for insubordination in 1942.

The British then established a council of chiefs in 1933 and referred to it as the tribal system after their attempt to impose supremacy over this largely stateless people failed. The establishment of indirect rule into the area surrounding the lower Pangani is one example of tribal aggregation that so perfectly exemplifies the procedure that it merits more in-depth discussion.

The old quarrel over the Shambaa kingdom's limits was brought back to life as a result of its restoration. The Zigua residents in the valley below the southern mountain face, according to the British, had recognised the king at Vugha "as their Overlord or Paramount Chief," according to the British, who said that they had "dominated the entire Usambara District except the South Pare Mountains."

== Legacy ==
During the British colonial occupation, the first Shambaa coffee plots were primarily in Vugha and Mlalo, but as land grew limited in the pioneer areas, the focus gradually switched to Bumbuli. In Usambara in 1930, The Shambaa held 35,324 coffee-bearing trees, 20,788 of which belonged to five of the 250 growers, all of whom lived in Vugha.

== See also ==
- Kilindi dynasty
- Mbegha
- Shambaa people
