= Shume =

Town in Lushoto District, Tanga Region

Coordinates: 4°42′0″S 38°13′0″E

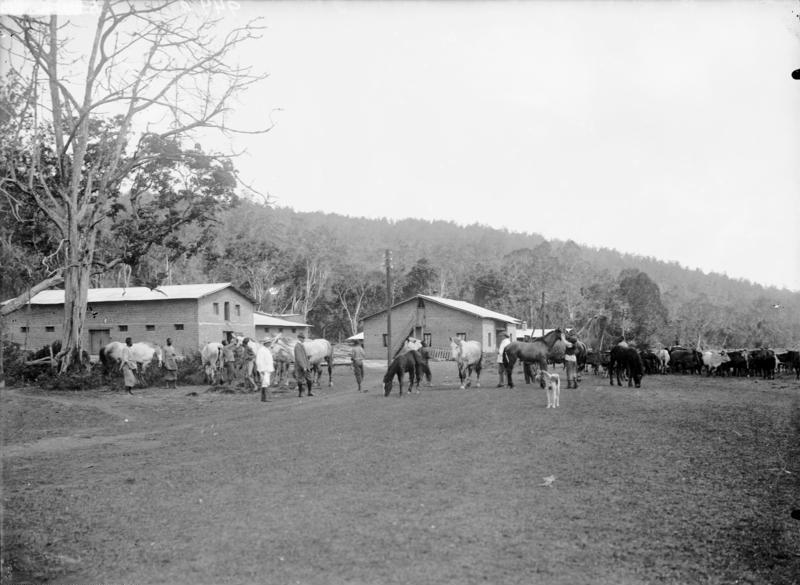
Neu-Hornow, c. 1910.

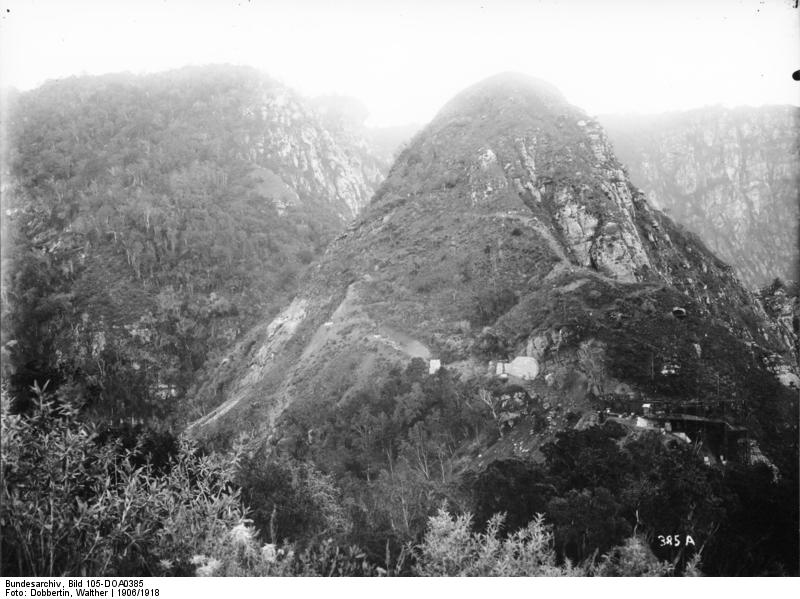
Nearby mountains, c. 1910.

Shume is a town in Tanzania in the Usambara Mountains in Lushoto District of Tanga Region. It was formerly known as New Hornow (German: Neu-Hornow) and was the location of a sawmill during the country's colonial period. Around 1910, a cable railway was constructed to link the mill with the Usambara line to permit export to Germany.
