= Mazinde =

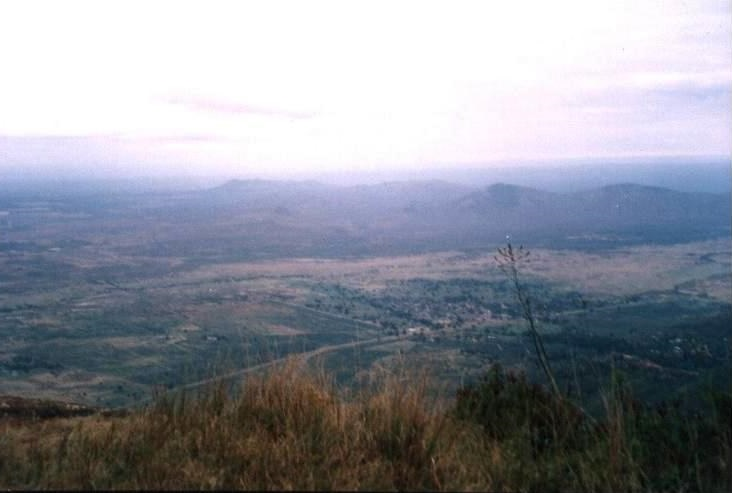
- View from Irente View Point on the Usambara Mountains, looking down on the Mazinde sisal plantation

- Location within Tanzania
- Coordinates: 4.807327°S 38.211841°E
- Country: Tanzania
- Region: Tanga Region
- District: Korogwe District
- Elevation: 571 m (1,873 ft)

Population
  - Total: 20,534
- Time zone: UTC+3 (EAT)

Mazinde is a community in the Korogwe District of the Tanga Region of Tanzania.

== Location ==
Mazinde lies in the Maasai plains to the west of the West Usambara Mountains. The community is on the main road between Moshi and Dar es Salaam. The cliffs rise almost vertically behind the village to the Irente viewpoint, 800 metres (2,600 ft) above.

== Pre-colonial era ==
Johann Jakob Erhardt recorded the repulse of a Maasai raid in 1853 at Mazinde by an allied army of Shambaa under Semboja, son of Kimweri ye Nyumbai, and of Wazigua, Parakuyo and "Arabs" (most likely Swahili). One of Kimweri's junior sons, Semboja, was made chief of Mazinde, which lay on the northern caravan route between the coast and the interior. He later allied himself with the Maasai. Semboja followed coastal architecture in the design of the buildings at Mazinda, dressed as an Arab and ate Arab-style food. However, the language at his trading post was Zigula rather than Swahili.

After Kimweri died, the Shambaa kingdom split up. Semboja retained authority at Mazinde, while his son Kimweri Maguvu reigned as a puppet in Vugha. In 1885 Kimweri Maguvu signed a treaty with a German agent, but Semboja did not at first support the arrangement. After an unsuccessful attempt to persuade his rivals to unite against the Germans, in February 1890 Semboja received a German force at Mazinde and agreed to raise their flag in return for recognition of his authority.

== Sisal ==
The Mazinde estate, owned by Major William Lead in 1930, was a major sisal plantation. In face of strong global competition, he organized East African sisal producers in Tanganyika into Tanganyikan Sisal Grower's Association (TSGA) that year, and reduced wages by 50%. Starting on 25 November 1958 the estate was the scene of a 68-day strike against the TSGA. The government was forced to intervene, and appointed a commission that recommended appointing representative for the plantation workers and establishing a new agreement between the union and the employers. While other sisal estates were nationalized by the post-colonial government, the Mazinde estate remained privately owned by a British national until being sold to M/s Mohammed Enterprises (T) Limited a few years before 2008.
