= Korogwe District =

District of Tanga Region, Tanzania

Korogwe Wilaya ya Korogwe (Swahili)
- District
- Wilaya ya Korogwe, Mkoa wa Tanga
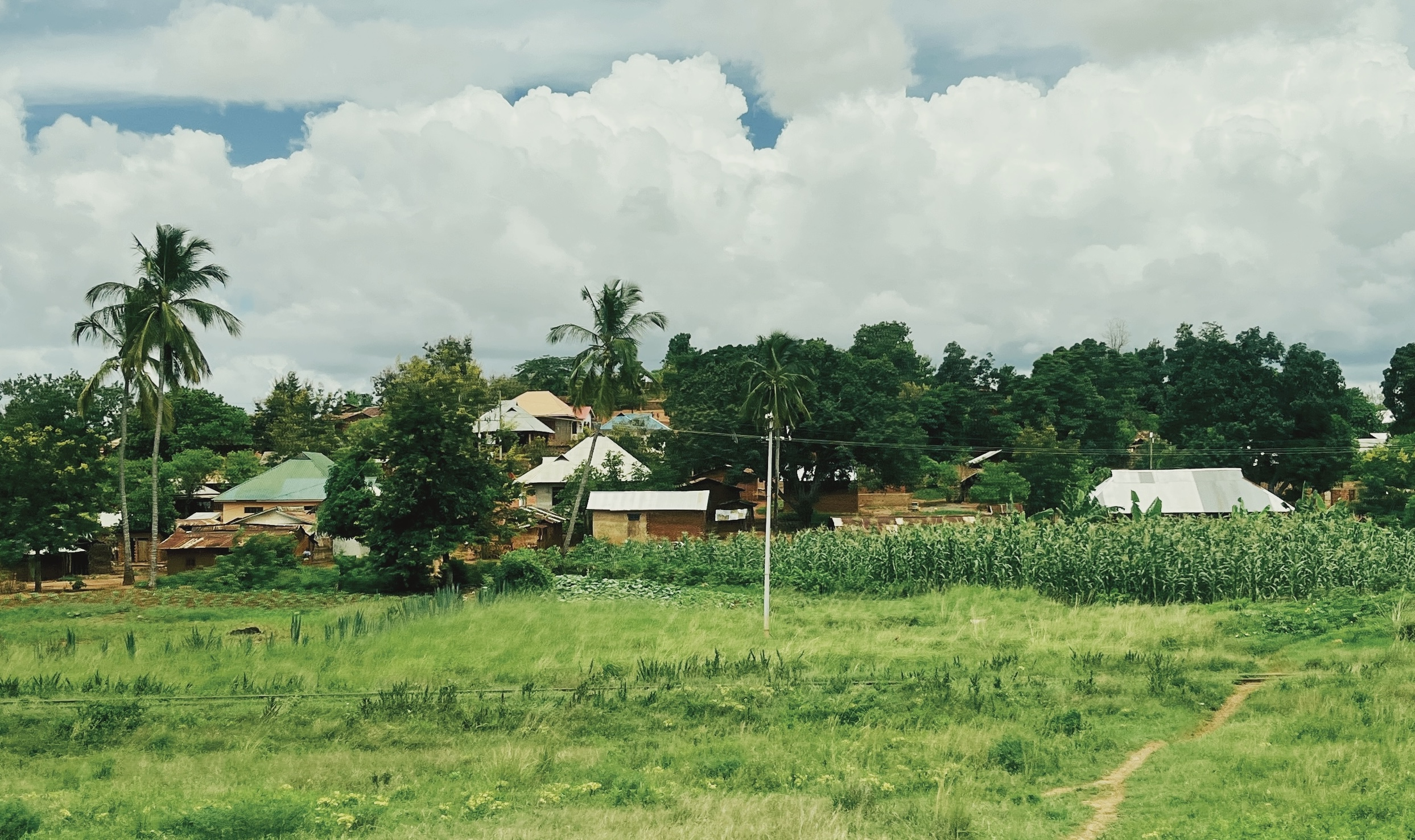
- Makuyuni Ward, Korogwe District Landscape
- Nickname: Tanga's garden
- Korogwe District in Tanga 2022
- Coordinates: 5°1′17.04″S 38°22′5.16″E
- Country: Tanzania
- Region: Tanga Region

Area
  - Total: 3,203 km^{2} (1,237 sq mi)
- Highest elevation (Mafi Peak): 1,442 m (4,731 ft)

Population (2022)
  - Total: 272,870
  - Density: 85.19/km^{2} (220.6/sq mi)
- Demonym: Korogwean

Ethnic groups
  - Settler: Swahili
  - Native: Sambaa, Bondei & Digo
- Website: District website

Korogwe District also known as Korogwe District Council is one of the eleven districts of Tanga Region in Tanzania. The District covers an area of 6,534 km^{2} (2,523 sq mi). It is bordered to the northeast by the Lushoto District and north by Bumbuli District. Korogwe District also bordered to the east by the Mkinga District and the Muheza District, to the South by the Handeni Rural District and the Korogwe Urban District, and to the West by the Kilimanjaro Region. The highest point in Korogwe District is Mafi Peak at 1,442m.

According to the 2012 Tanzania National Census, the population of Korogwe Rural District was 242,038. By 2022, the population had grown to 272,870.

== Administrative subdivisions ==
As of 2012, Korogwe Rural District was administratively divided into 20 wards.

=== Wards ===
1. Bungu
2. Chekelei
3. Dindira
4. Kizara
5. Kerenge
1. Kwagunda
2. Kwashemshi
3. Lutindi
4. Magamba Kwalukonge
1. Magoma
2. Makuyuni
3. Mashewa
4. Mazinde
5. Mkalamo
1. Mkomazi
2. Mombo
3. Mpale
4. Mswaha
5. Vugiri

== Education & Health ==
As of 2022, there were 165 Schools in Korogwe District, 138 of are primary schools and 27 are secondary schools.

In Terms of Healthcare facilities, as of 2022 Korogwe District is home to 3 health centers,1 hospitals and 48 clinics.
