= Lushoto District =

District of Tanga Region, Tanzania

Coordinates: 4°47′55″S 38°17′25″E

Lushoto Wilaya ya Lushoto (Swahili)
- District
- Wilaya ya Lushoto, Mkoa wa Tanga
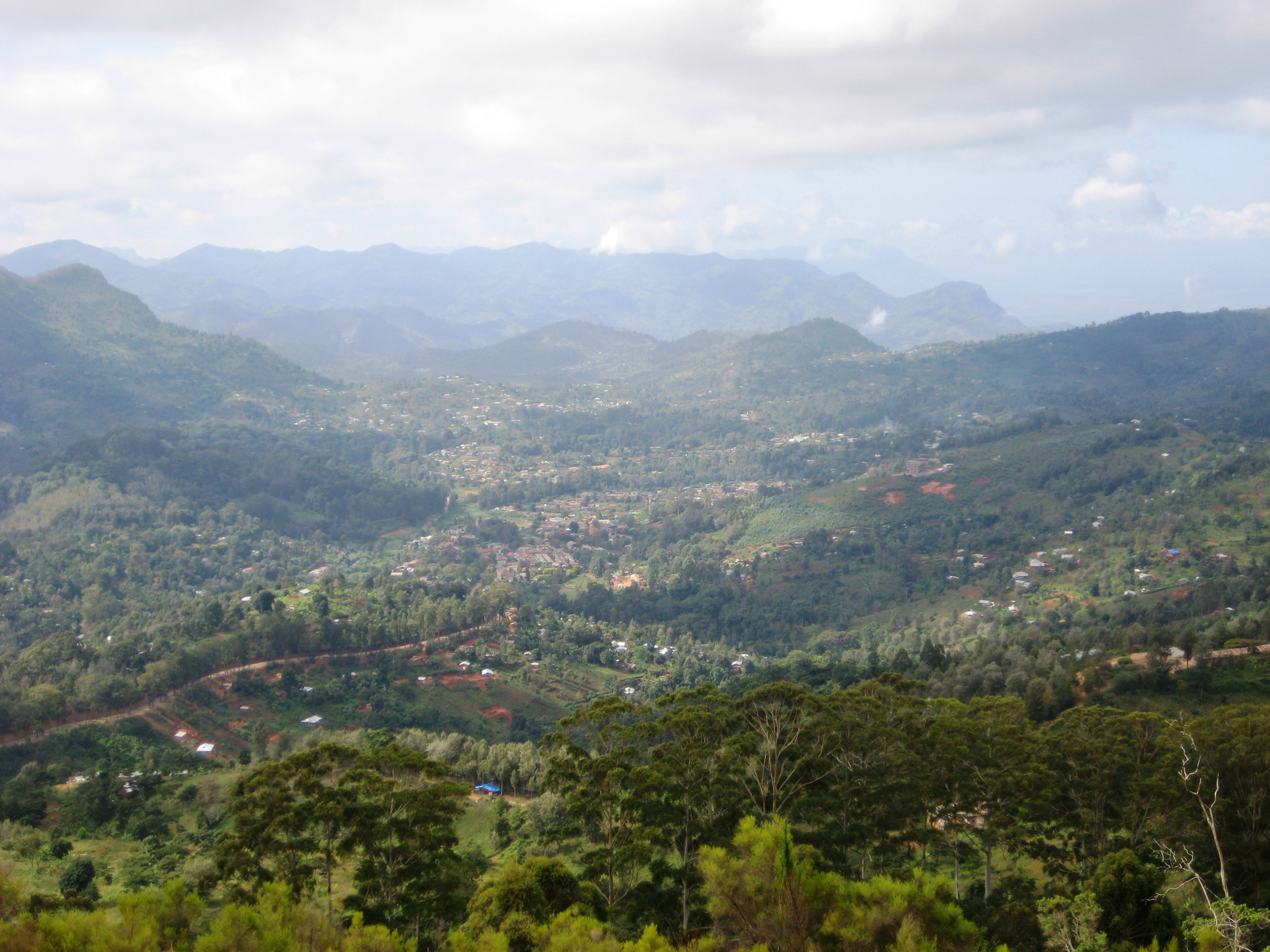
- Aerial view of Lushoto

- Location within Tanga.
- Country: Tanzania
- Zone: Northern
- Region: Tanga
- Established: January 2016
- Seat: member of parliament

Government
  - District Commissioner: Majidi mwanga (shabani omari shekilindi)

Area
  - Total: 3,297 km^{2} (1,273 sq mi)

Population (2022)
  - Total: 350,958
  - Density: 106.4/km^{2} (275.7/sq mi)
- Time zone: UTC+3 (EAT)
- Postcode: 217xx
- Area code: 027
- Website: District website

Lushoto is one of the eleven districts of Tanga Region in Tanzania. It is bordered to the northeast by Kenya, to the east by the Muheza District, to the northwest by the Kilimanjaro Region, west by Korogwe District and to the south by the Bumbuli District. The district's capital and largest town is Lushoto.

== History ==
The earliest inhabitants of Lushoto district were the Sambaa. Who formed the Shambaa Kingdom during the 18th to 20th centuries based in Vugha. During the German occupation l, Lushoto town was named Wilhelmstal (William's Valley) and was named after Emperor Wilhelm II.

During the German colonial period from the 1890s to 1918 the area was popular with settlers, hence the German place name of Wilhelmstal. Large farms and plantations were created, and the district was valued for its pleasant mountain climate. Numerous church missions were, and remain, active.

Between 1893 and 1911, the German Ostafrikanische Eisenbahngesellschaft (East African Railway Company) constructed an important railway line starting at Tanga on the coast and passing along the Usambara Mountains with a station at Mombo, about 20 kilometers (12 mi) from Wilhelmstal, to "New" Moshi at Kilimanjaro. The initial plan of the Usambarabahn was to connect the port of Tanga with Lake Victoria by passing south of the Usambara Mountains. This was in direct competition with parallel British efforts in colonial Kenya. From 4 June 1912 to 12 May 1913, the line was renamed Nordbahn (Northern Railway).

According to the 2002 Tanzania National Census, the population of the Lushoto District was 419,970. By 2012, the population had increased to 492,441. In 2016, Lushoto district was separated from Bumbuli District there to population of Lushot as of 2012 was 332,436. In 2022, the population was 350,958.

== Administrative subdivisions ==
=== Wards ===
As of 2012, Lushoto District is administratively divided into 28 wards:

1. Lushoto
2. Gare
3. Kwai
4. Ubiri
5. Mtae
6. Sunga
7. Rangwi
8. Mnazi
9. Lunguza
10. Mbaramo
11. Mng'aro
12. Mlalo
13. Mwangoi
14. Shume
15. Malindi
16. Hemtoye
17. Malibwi
18. Mlola
19. Makanya
20. Ngwelo
21. Kilole
22. Kwekanga
23. Lukozi
24. Manolo
25. Dule M
26. Kwemshasha
27. Ngulwi
28. Kwemashai

== Gallery ==
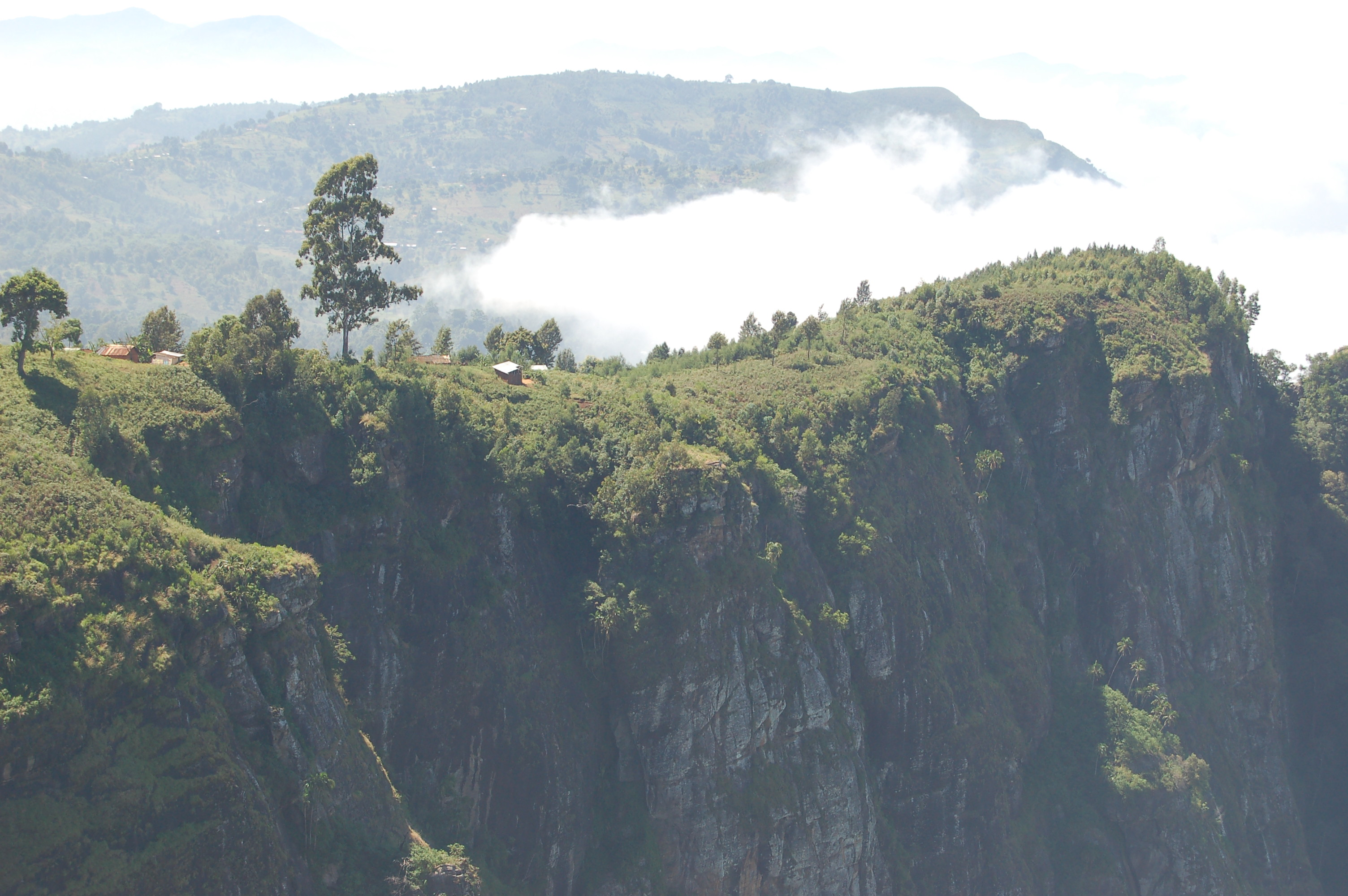
The Usambara Mountains.

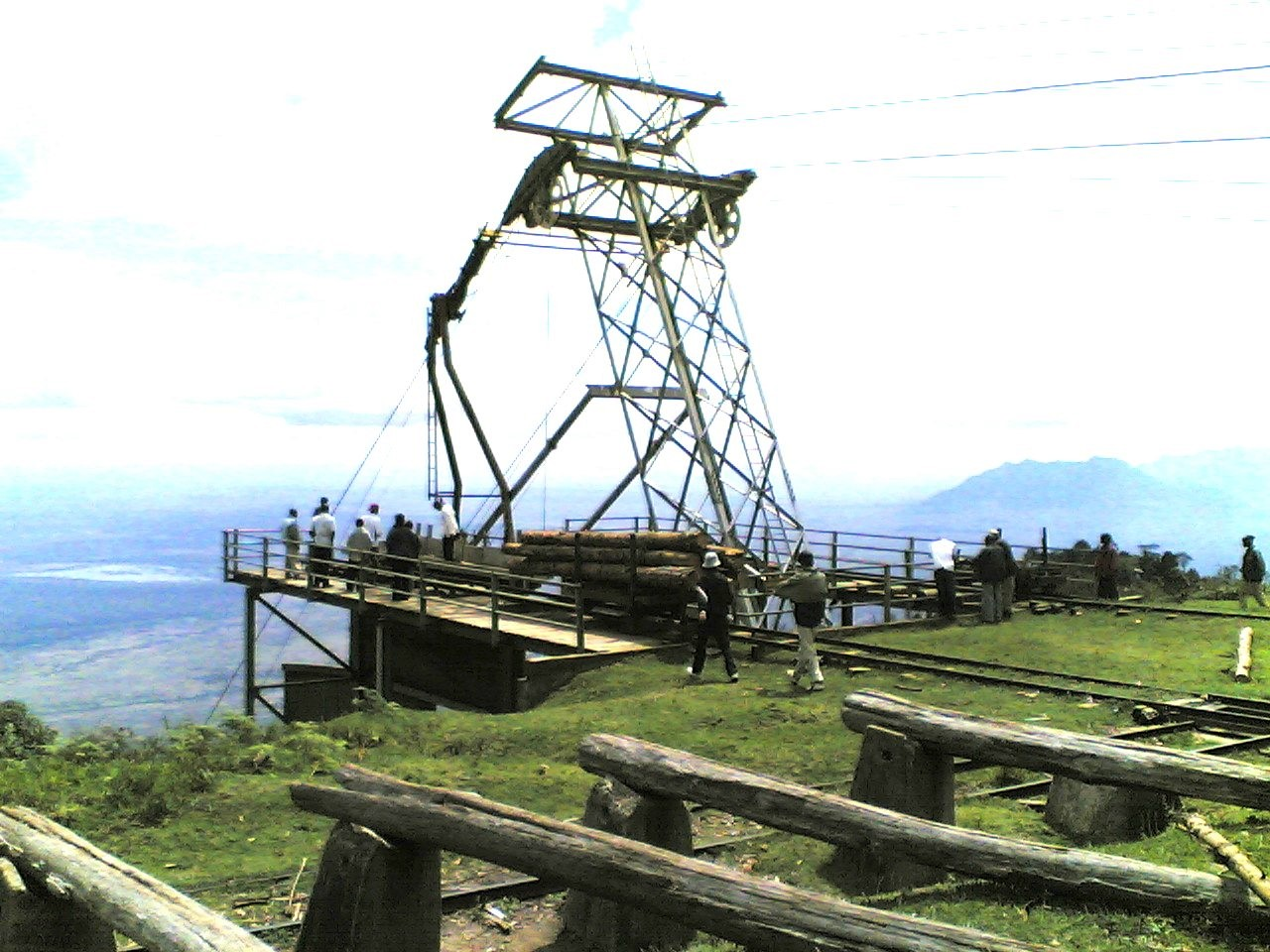
The cable Yarding System at Shume.

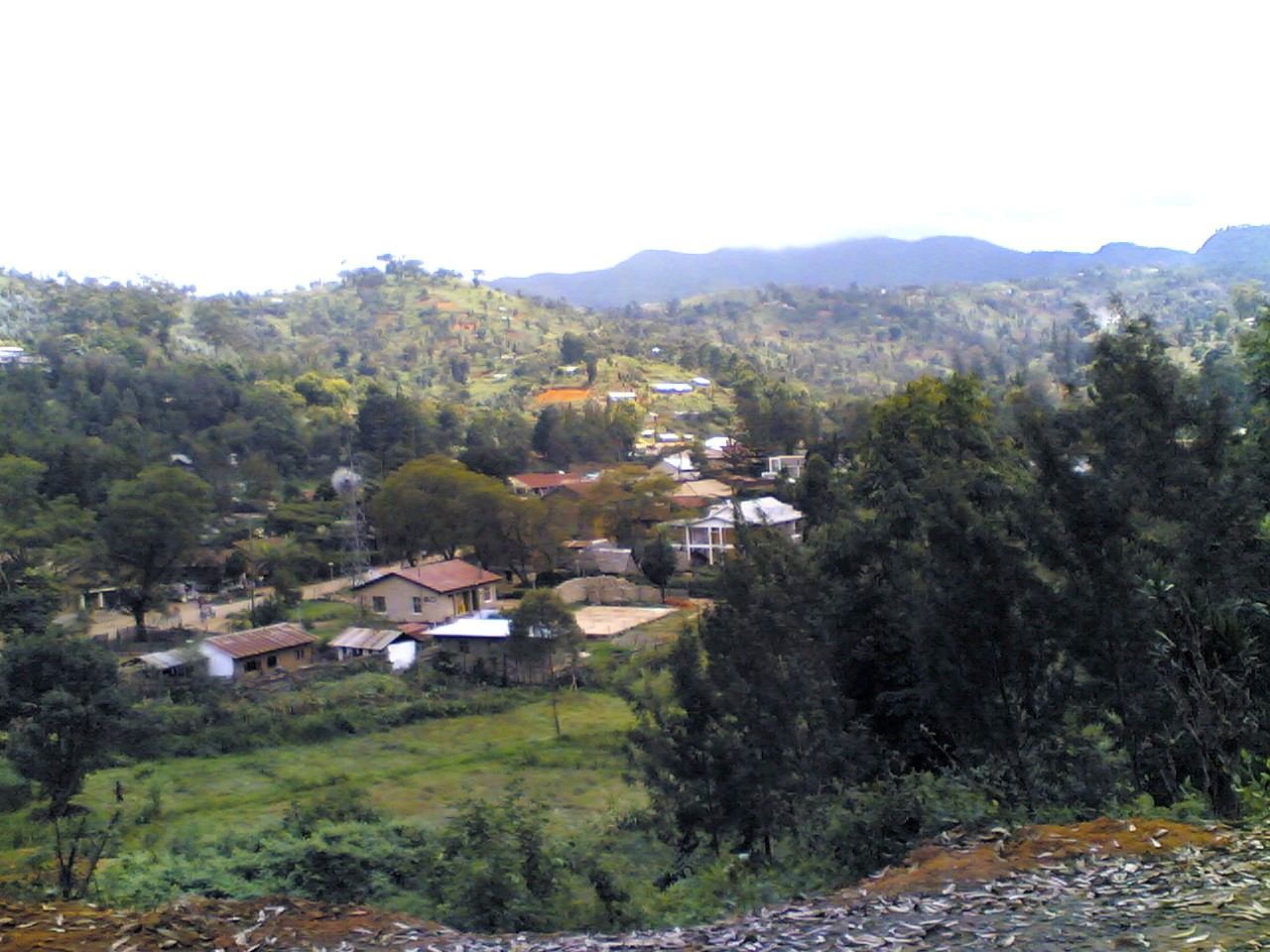
Lushoto in the Tanga Region.

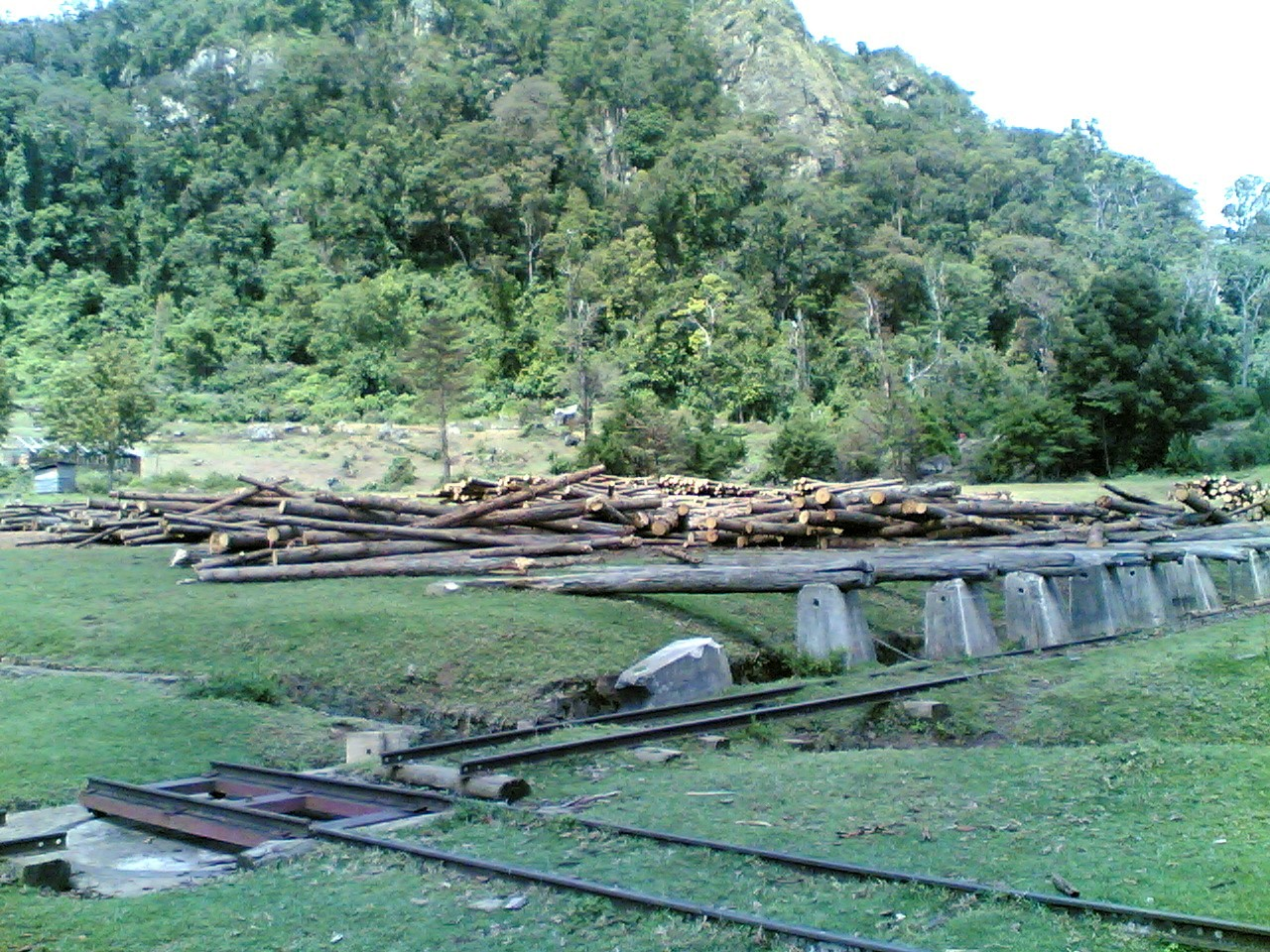
Lumbering

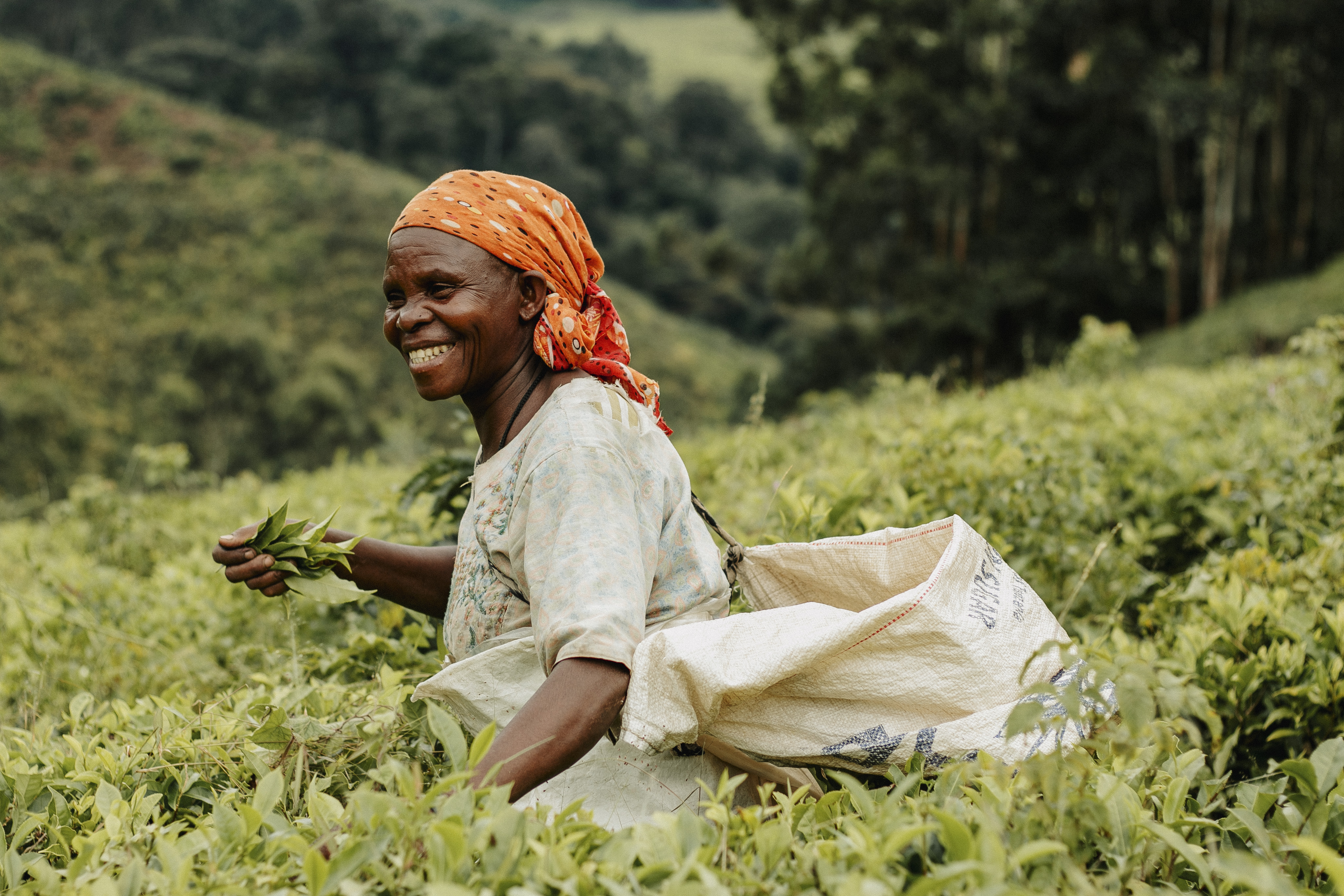
Harvesting tea leaves at Bumbuli plantation.

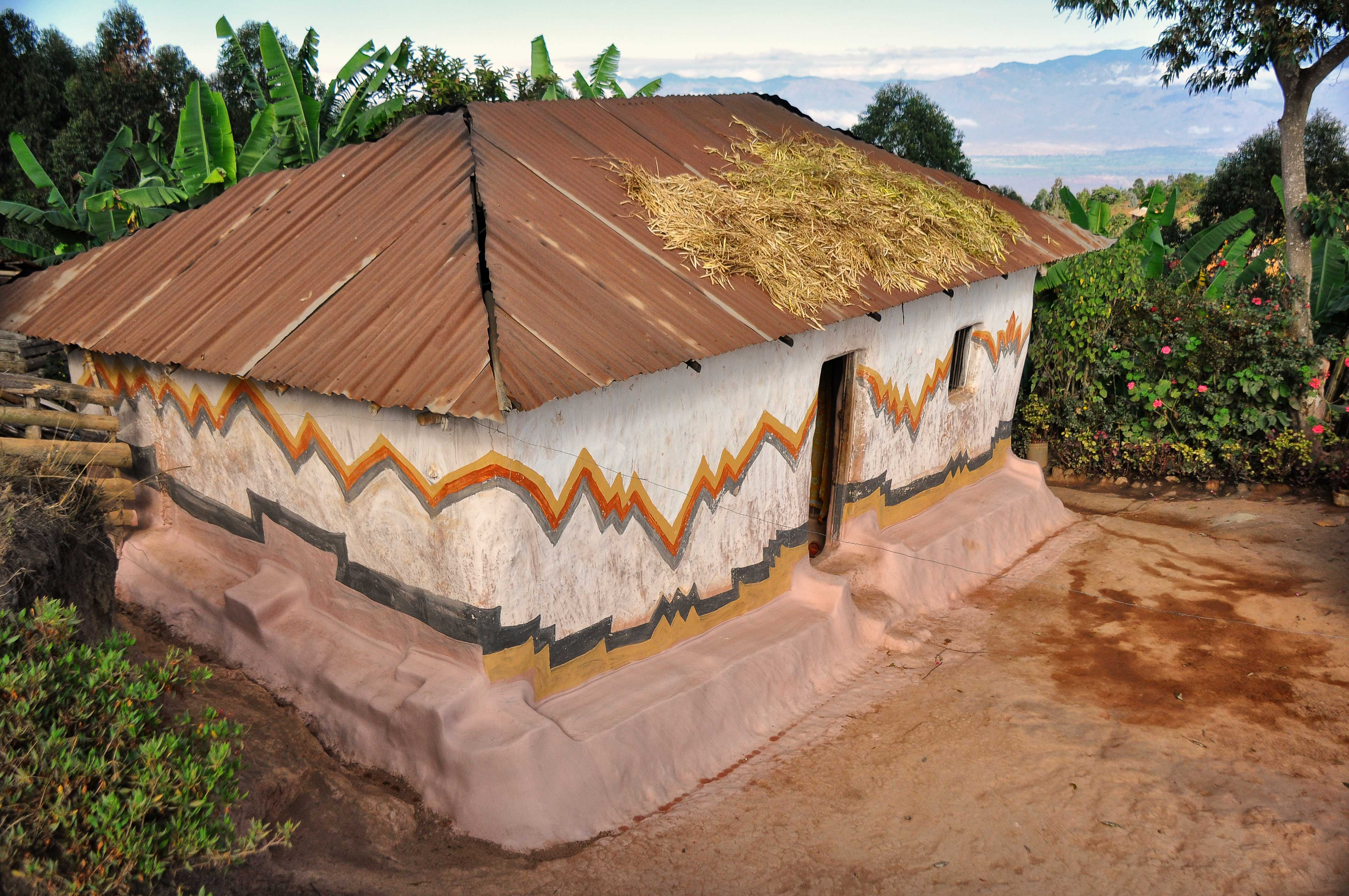
A house

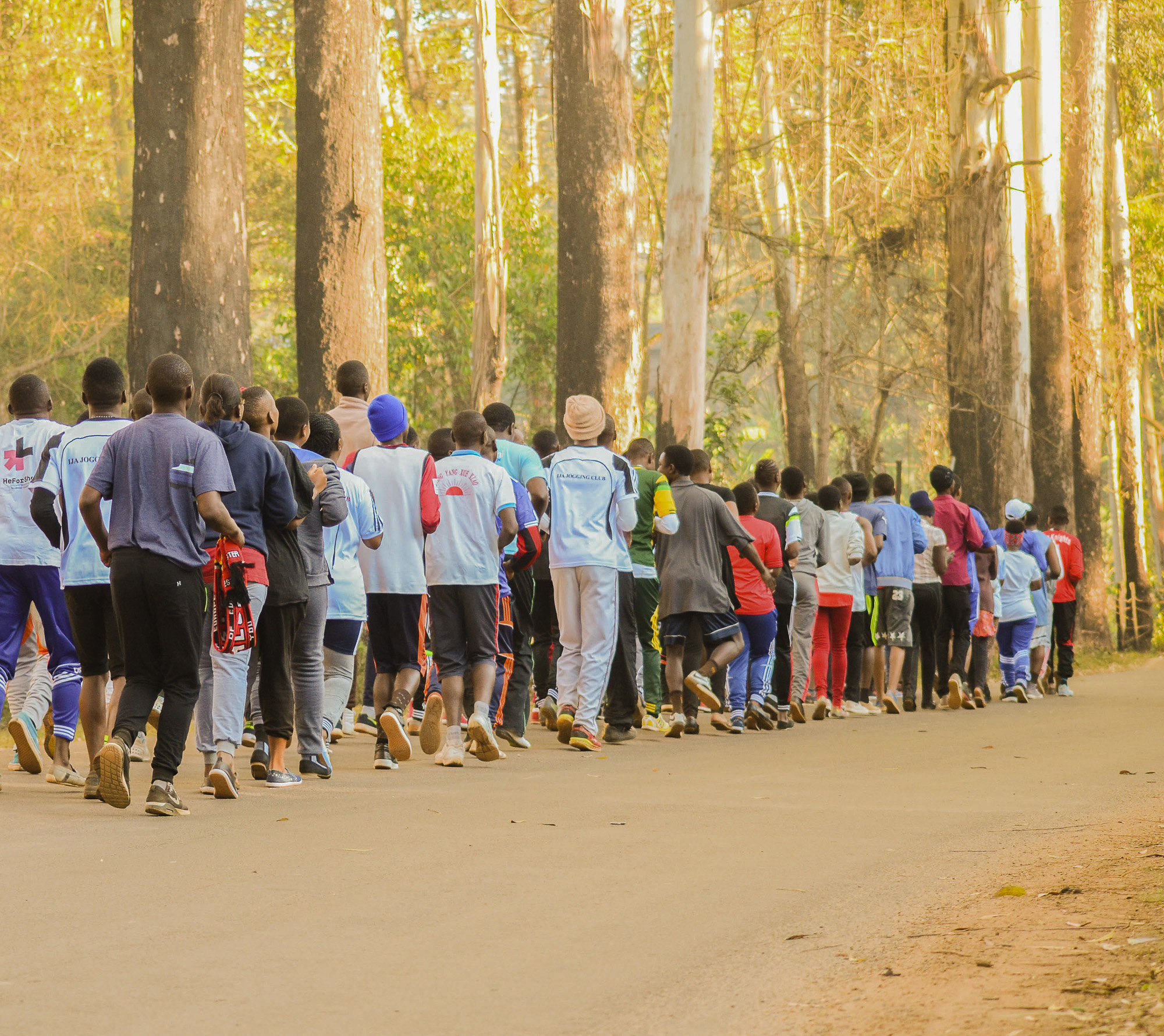
Local jogging club.

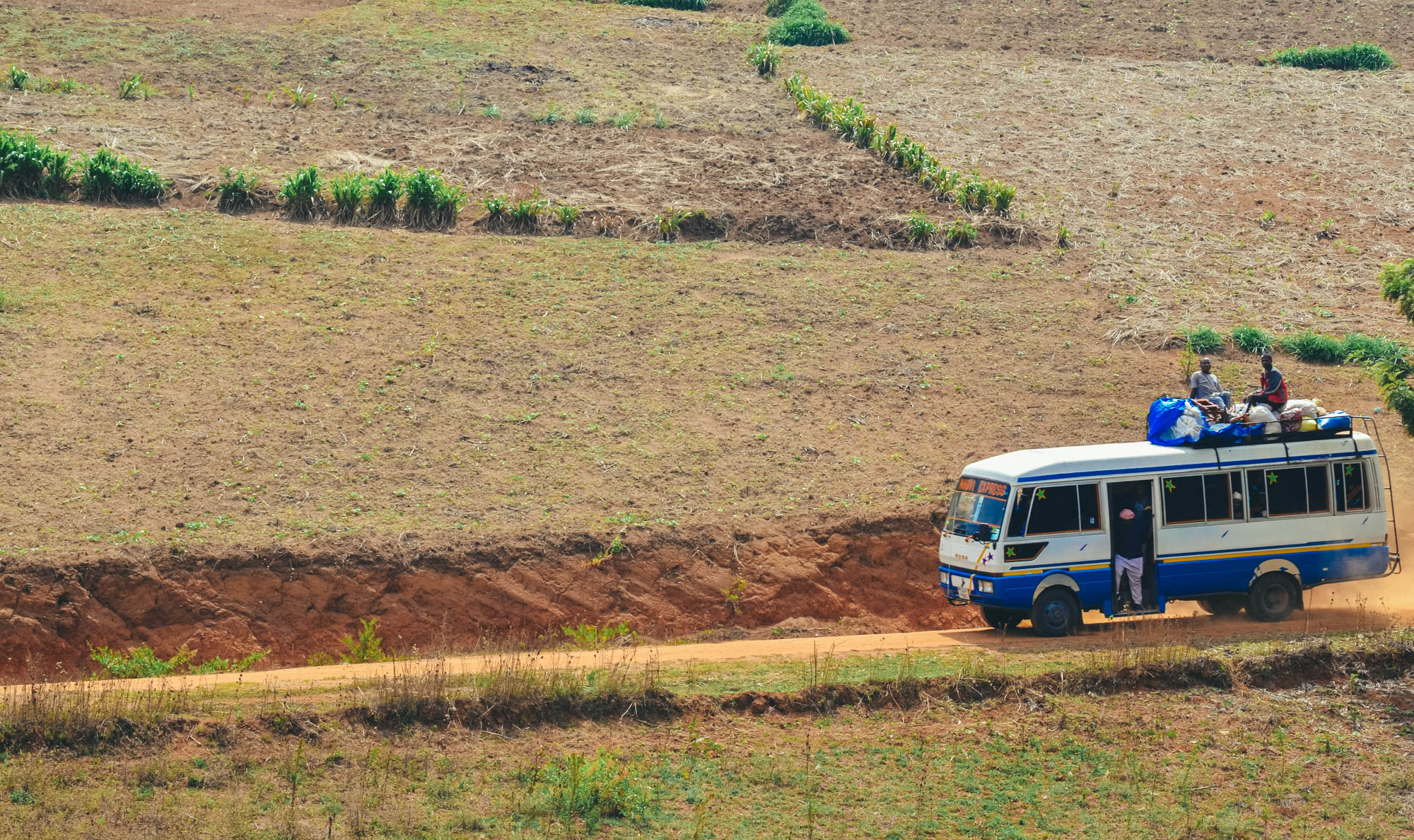
Bus between Lushoto and Lukosi.

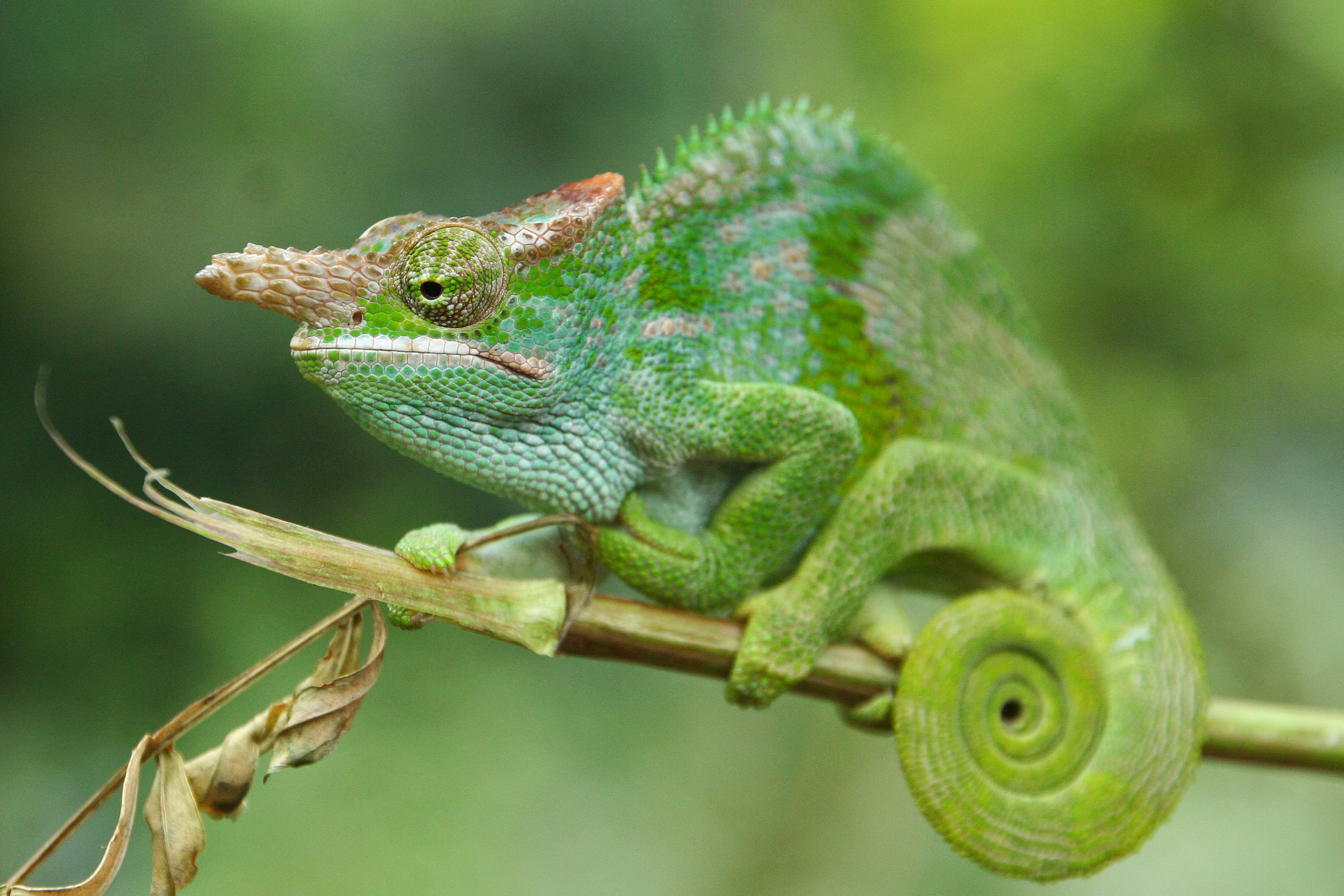
Kinyongia multituberculata
