= Ngulu language =

Bantu language spoken in Tanzania

Ngulu
- Kingulu
- Native to: Tanzania
- Region: East-central Tanzania
- Ethnicity: Ngulu
- Native speakers: (130,000 cited 1987)
- Language family: Niger–Congo?: Atlantic–Congo; Volta–Congo languages; Benue–Congo; Bantoid; Southern Bantoid languages; Bantu; Northeast Coast Bantu languages; Seuta; Ngulu

Language codes
- ISO 639-3: ngp
- Glottolog: ngul1246
- Guthrie code: G.34

Ngulu is a Bantu language spoken in east-central Tanzania. In 1987 the Ngulu-speaking population was estimated to number 132,000. The Ngulu language is also called Geja, Kingulu, Kinuu, Nguru, Nguu, or Wayomba.
