= Shambala language =

Bantu language spoken in Tanzania

Sambaa
- kisambaa
- Native to: Tanzania
- Ethnicity: Shambaa
- Native speakers: (660,000 cited 2001)
- Language family: Niger–Congo?: Atlantic–Congo; Volta-Congo; Benue–Congo; Bantoid; Southern Bantoid; Bantu; Northeast Bantu; Northeast Coast Bantu; Seuta; Sambaa

Language codes
- ISO 639-3: ksb
- Glottolog: sham1280
- Guthrie code: G.23

Sambaa or Shambaa or Shambala is a Bantu language of Tanzania.

== Overview ==
Sambaa, also Kisambaa, (ki)Shambaa, (ki)Shambala is spoken by the Shambaa in the Usambara mountains in the Lushoto District and Muheza District, Tanga Region, of northern Tanzania. Some dialectal variation exists between the language as spoken in the area around Lushoto and the areas around Mlalo and Mtae, possibly also between the Shambaa of the Western Usambara Mountains and the Eastern Usambara Mountains.

== Phonology ==
=== Vowels ===
Five vowels are noted as [i, ɛ, a, ɔ, u].

=== Consonants ===
		Labial	Alveolar	Palatal	Velar	Glottal
Plosive/ Affricate	voiceless	p	t	tʃ	k	
Plosive/ Affricate	voiced	b	d	ɟ	ɡ	
Plosive/ Affricate	vl. prenasal	ᵐ̥p	ⁿ̥t		ᵑ̊k	
Plosive/ Affricate	vd. prenasal	ᵐb	ⁿd	ᶮɟ	ᵑɡ	
Fricative	voiceless	f	s	ʃ		h
Fricative	voiced	v	z		ɣ	
Nasal		m	n	ɲ	ŋ	
Approximant		w	l	j		

The diacritics within prenasal voiceless plosives are devoiced as [ᵐ̥ ⁿ̥ ᵑ̊].
