= Bumbuli District =

District of Tanga Region, Tanzania

Bumbuli Wilaya ya Bumbuli (Swahili)
- District
- Wilaya ya Bumbuli, Mkoa wa Tanga
- Bumbuli District in Tanga 2022
- Coordinates: 04°52′7.32″S 38°27′40.68″E
- Country: Tanzania
- Region: Tanga Region
- District: 2013
- Capital: Kwehangala

Population (2022)
  - Total: 159,373
- Demonym: Bumbulian

Ethnic groups
  - Settler: Swahili
  - Native: Sambaa, Bondei & Digo

Bumbuli is one of the 11 districts of Tanga Region in Tanzania. The district is bordered to the north the Lushoto District and is surrounded on three sides in the south by Korogwe District. It was split from Lushoto District in 2013.

== Administrative subdivisions ==
As of 2016, Bumbuli District was administratively divided into 18 wards.

=== Wards ===
1. Baga
2. Bumbuli
3. Dule B
4. Funta
5. Kisiwani
6. Kwemkomole
7. Maheza Ngulu
8. Mamba
9. Mayo
10. Mbuzii
11. Mgwashi
12. Milingano
13. Mponde
14. Nkongoi
15. Soni
16. Tamota
17. Usambara
18. Vuga
