= Mbugu people =

Ethnic group from Tanga Region of Tanzania

Mbugu
Wambugu

Total population
- 60,000

Regions with significant populations
- Tanzania Tanga Region (Lushoto District) (Bumbuli District)

Languages
- Mbugu, Pare, Shambaa & Swahili

Religion
- Majority Christianity, Minority Islam and African Traditional Religion

Related ethnic groups
- Shambaa, Zigua, Pare & other Bantu peoples

- Person: Mbugu
- People: Wambugu
- Language: Kimbugu

The Mbugu people, also known as the Va'maa, Ma'a (Wambugu, in Swahili) are an ethnic Bantu and linguistic group hailing from western Usambara Mountains of Lushoto District in Tanga Region of Tanzania. Tanzania's Mbugu (or Ma'á) language is one of the few true hybrid languages, combining Bantu grammar with Cushitic lexicon. In actuality, the people speak two languages: one closely related to Pare and the other mixed (differing from the first mainly in the lexicon). They are approximately 60,000 living Mbugu people.

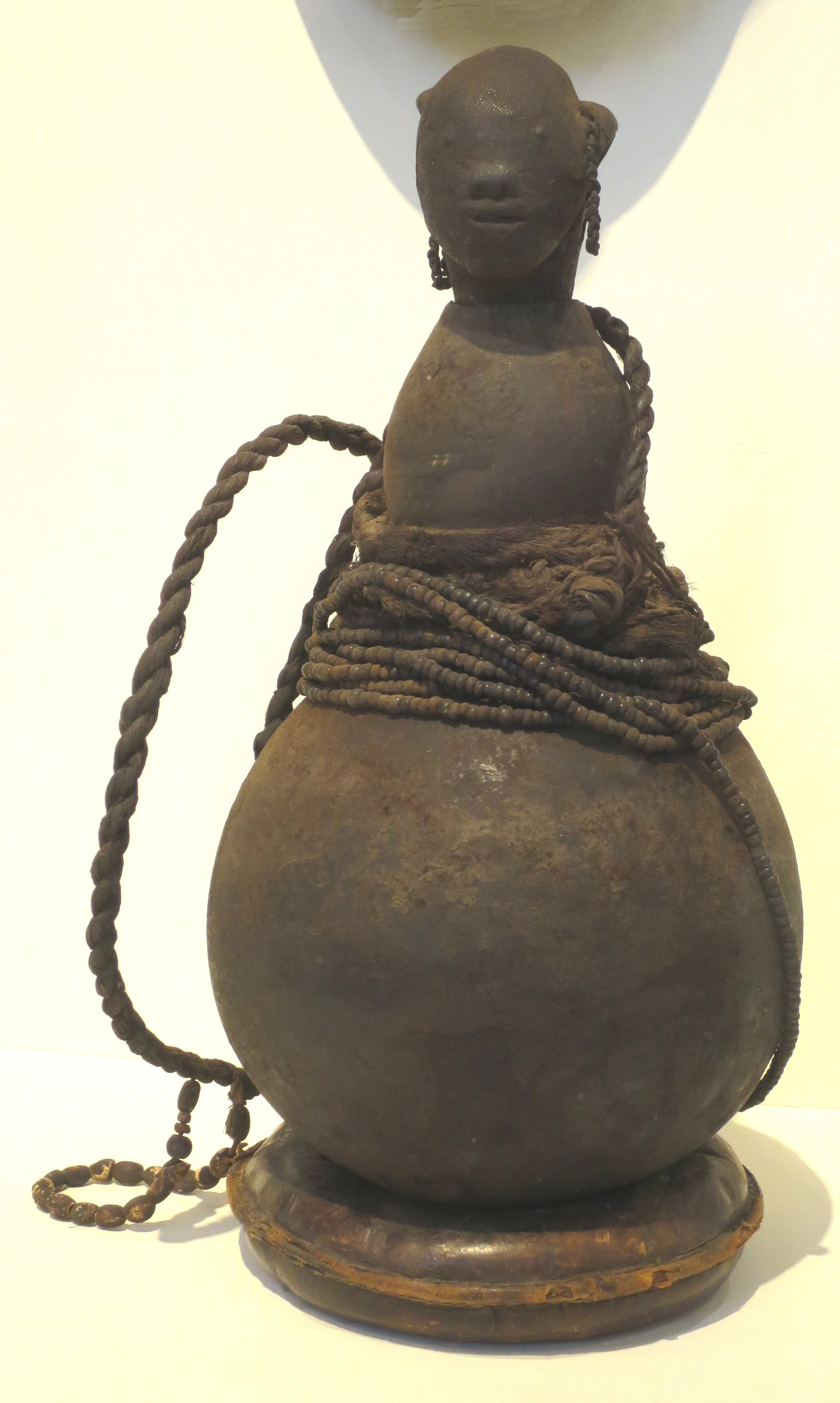
Shaman's stoppered gourd vessel, Mbugu people, Honolulu Museum of Art

== Origins ==
Historically the Mbugu were in the vicinity of Lake Victoria or, less likely, Lake Eyasi. However, Archibald Tucker's informant used the Swahili phrase bahari ya pili, which means 'the other/second sea' and can also refer to a broad plain. As a result, it's possible that the Serengeti was in mind. From there, the Kwavi drove the Mbugu away and followed them to Mugwe in the east. Meinhof speculates that they may have interacted with the Burungi there or nearby. Similar to Mbugu, Burungi, like Iraqw, is a Southern Cushitic language.

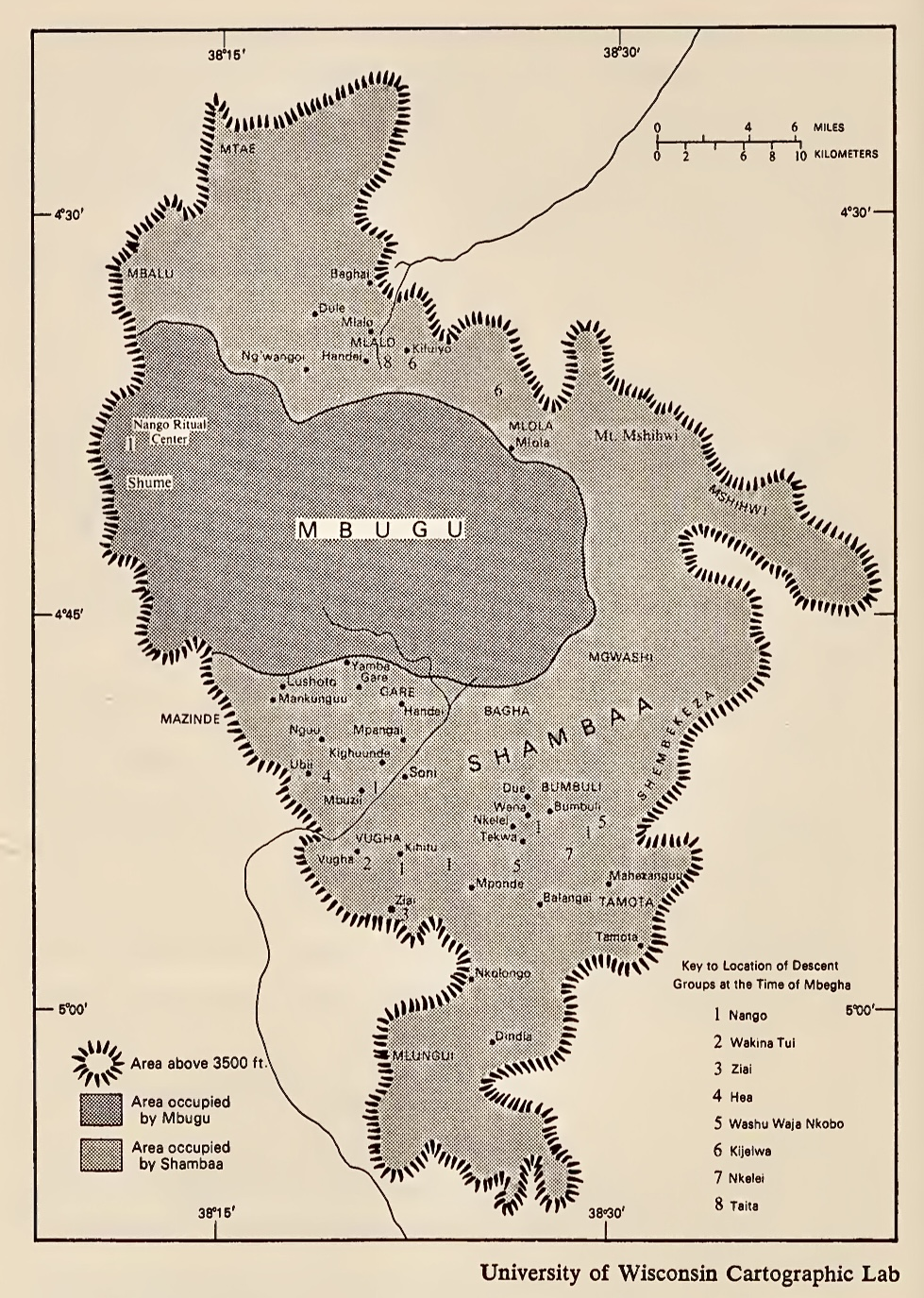
Map of Shambaa and Mbugu lands c1800s

The tribe then divided into three sections, traveling once again eastward through Moshi and Same to Lasa in the valley between the western Usambara Mountains and the southern Pare Mountains. Previously, the tribe had been in Ugweno, in the northern Pare Mountains.

=== Mbugu clans ===
The tribe was divided into three groups: six clans of Mbugu; six clans each of Nango and Dufu. When the Maasai attacked them at Lasa, they broke off once more: the Dufu moved south into Zigua territory and assimilated into the Zigua; the Nango went to Shume in Usambara and continued to be a Sambaa clan.

The remaining group (the six Mbugu clans) reversed into Pare, where they later kept in touch with Vudei for a long time. The Mbugu travelled to Usangi, which is immediately south of Ugweno, but it is unclear at what point they were there. Later, they relocated south once more, this time to Shume in Usambara. Some writers, like Meyer, have used the name Kwambugu to refer to a region in the same general area of Usambara as Shume. They discovered the Nango already established here; later, they expanded into Usambara, reaching Malo, Magamba near Lushoto, and Bumbuli.

According to legend, the Mbugu lived in Usambara prior to 1650. The main body of the Mbugu could have followed, possibly not too long after, if the legend that Mbegha, the founder of the Kilindi dynasty in Usambara, had a Nango wife is true. Then Nango must have been established there by the seventeenth century. The following remarks concerning the "Mbugu" give some indications of a perplexed language situation: The "Mbugu" identify as va-ma'a and speak ki-ma'a. The clans that traveled to Usangi solely speak Kipare.

Despite having lived in Usambara for more than 200 years, some of the clans there solely speak Kipare. The 'Mbugu' claim that there are no more songs and folktales in their language; all of the proverbs, songs, and tales I gathered were in Chasu. The Wambugu have a distinctive tone when speaking Kipare. There are a few linked families in Magamba' that speak a language that no-one can decipher. The Sambaa distinguish between two Wambugu lineages that have entirely different origins. These are from "Umbugwe", also known as Wambugwe, and "Ukwavi-Upare", also known as Wambugu-Makei.
