= Pare people =

Ethnic group from Kilimanjaro Region of Tanzania

Pare
Wapare

Total population
- ~ 735,000

Regions with significant populations
- Tanzania: 731,000 Kilimanjaro Region (Mwanga District) (Same District)
- Kenya: 4,400 (Taita-Taveta)

Languages
- Pare & Gweno Dialects: Chasu related to Taita; Gweno related to Taveta and Chaga; Mbugu, a mixed Cushitic language & Swahili

Religion
- Majority Islam, Minority Christianity and African Traditional Religion

Related ethnic groups
- Chaga, Bondei, Zigua, Sambaa & other Bantu peoples

- Person: Mpare
- People: Wapare
- Language: Kipare

The Pare (pronounced "Pahray") (Wapare, in Swahili) are a Bantu ethnic group. Their ancestral home is on the Pare Mountains of Same District and Mwanga District of Kilimanjaro Region in Northerneast Tanzania.

During his visit to Usambara in 1848, German Colonial explorer J. L. Krapf was informed, among other things, that there were the Pare and Gweno people living in the north. It seems that the people of South Pare were referred to by the former name, and the people of North Pare by the latter. Nowadays, both groups are referred by the name Pare. The Pare Mountains' southern peaks were known as "Mpare," thus it is evident from certain Pare customs that the name Pare may have been bestowed upon them by their neighbours to the south. It appears that Pareland consisted of two distinct communities until the early nineteenth century, although they had been progressively merging since the latter part of the eighteenth century.

Historically, Pareland was also known as Vuasu (South Pare) and Vughonu (North Pare) to its inhabitants. Their historic location lies on one of the northern routes of the historic East-African long-distance trade, connecting the hinterland with the coast of the Indian Ocean.

The people of Vuasu (Asu being the root word) are referred to as Vaasu and they speak a language known as Chasu or Athu. The people of Vughonu (Ugweno, in Swahili) are referred to as Vaghonu (Wagweno in Swahili) and they speak a language known as Kighonu (Gweno in Swahili).

== Language ==
Although once constituting a single, greater Vughonu area; current residents of northern Pare recognise two sub-areas based on ethnolinguistic differences: Gweno-speaking Ugweno to the north and Chasu-speaking Usangi to the south. The general interaction of the Pare people with the Ma'a (Va-ma'a) or Mbugu people (an ethnic group with Cushitic origins) has also led to one of the few genuinely mixed languages, reputedly combining Chasu (Bantu) grammar with Cushitic vocabulary (i.e. Mbugu language).

Pare women of southern Kilimanjaro c.1890s-1900s

== History ==
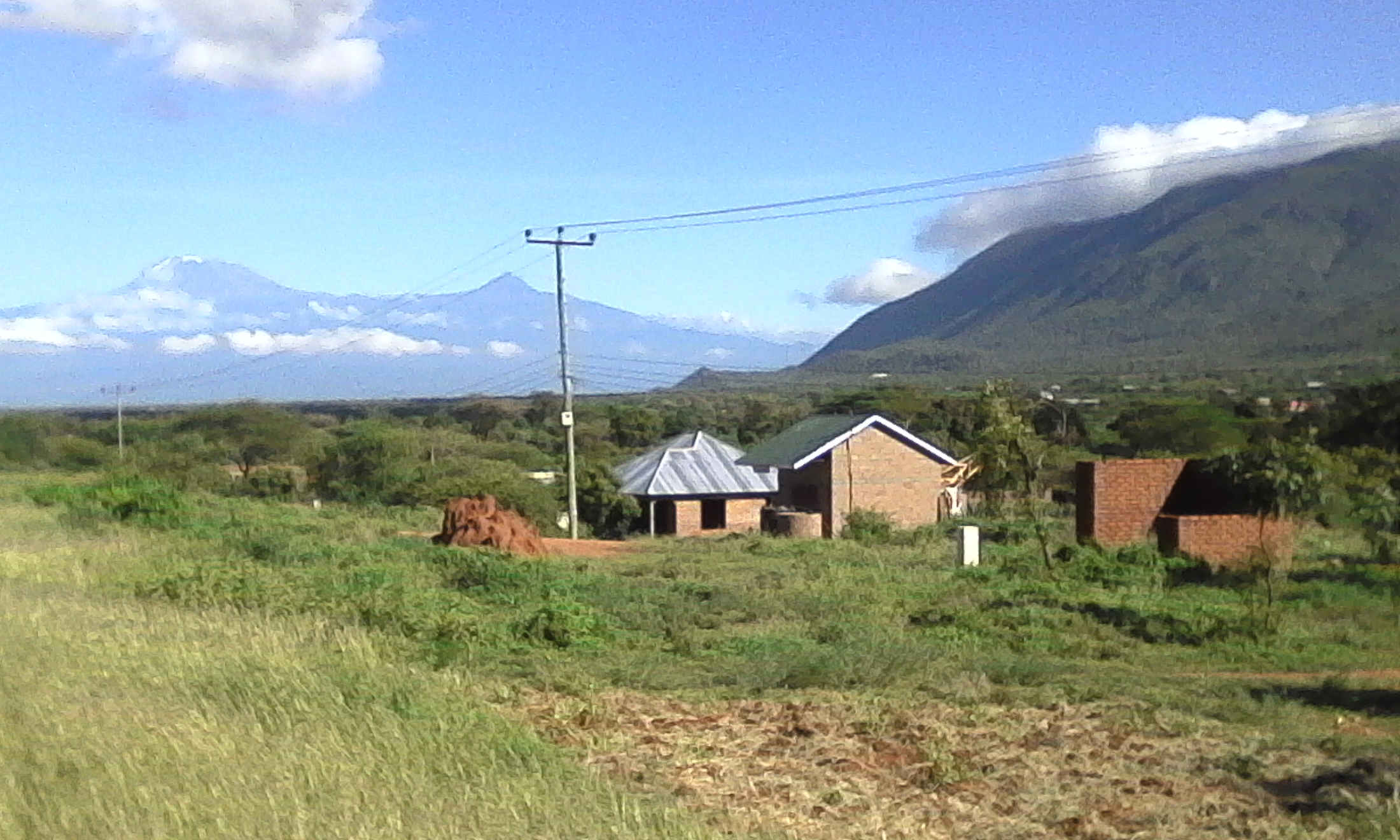
Mt. Kilimanjaro on the left and the start of the Pare mountains on the right

The Pare were the main producers of iron for which there was considerable demand from the Chaga and Maasai people, as well as other adjacent populations. Notable Pare blacksmiths include the Shana clan (Shana, meaning blacksmith), who have maintained the tradition to this day.

The Pare are traditionally highly organised in terms of compulsory community work towards sustainable and inclusive development through a philosophy referred to as msaragambo.

The Usangi Kingdom between Ugweno to the north and Mgagao in the south was ruled by Mfumwa Sangiwa I (Mfumwa, meaning Chief or King) who died in 1923, Mfumwa Koshuma Sangiwa up to 1928, Mfumwa Sabuni and finally Mfumwa Shaban Mtengeti Sangiwa up to the abolition of traditional rule following the independence of Tanganyika.

In Ugweno, a chief or King was referred to as Mangi, the term also used by the Chaga. At the peak of its power, the Ugweno state had at its head a Mangi Mrwe (Supreme/Paramount Chief/ King) who was assisted by governing councils, ministers and district chiefs.

The Pare were also known as rainmakers, one notable exponent being Mfumwa Muhammad Kibacha Singo, a local ruler of Same who died in January 1981. In these rituals (as well as other cultural practices e.g. healing, initiation, etc.), spiritual figurines were often used that had been artistically sculptured out of clay or wood, and wrapped in either cloth and/or leather. Recent interest in such artefacts from collectors and researchers has unearthed them throughout the western world.

=== Early history ===
We can infer from archaeological evidence that the current Pare people did not originate as the first Bantu speakers to occupy the Pare Mountains. A type of pottery that is typically connected to Bantu-speaking communities has been discovered in South Pare, and radiocarbon dating has proven that it dates back well before the year 1000 A.D.

Some of these early sites are associated by Pare traditions with people who lived there before the current Pare population and were either driven out or assimilated by the newcomers; however, these traditions refer to these early inhabitants in an unclear way by the name "Galla".

However, Gweno people appear to be the most ancient among the current population. According to a number of Gweno traditions, their society was already fairly well stratified by the time they were sixteen generations old, or around the start of the sixteenth century. It featured lineages with expertise in rituals, iron forging, and smelting. The political power in the nation belonged to the iron forging lineage, known as the Shana. Uncertainty remains regarding Ugweno history under the Shana. Before 1500, Ugweno society might have existed for a few generations.

=== Later migrations ===
This region has historically received a substantial population of people from the Taita region of present-day Kenya. The Pare area was also inhabited by Cushitic groups such as the Mbugu in Ugweno who were eventually assimilated into the Pare communities. Additionally, the inhabitants reveal that migration occurred back and forth throughout the region, and the Pare people should be viewed as a part of the larger population that inhabits the entire Kilimanjaro Corridor.

In South Pare, Cushitic-speaking peoples and small Bantu-speaking groups populated the dry foothills and plains before the 1700s, later saw an influx of immigrants from neighbouring communities that included Taita people, as well as those escaping civil war from North Pare. This region had a separate rule from the north and its own evolution of political systems.

The nineteenth and twentieth centuries would see this process of convergence of individuals from various backgrounds into the Pare communities continue.

=== Pare kingdoms ===
==== Shana dynasty (pre 16th c.) ====
This era can be categorised as the 'age of skill' for the North Pare communities. Although little evidence remains about this era due to 'the great Shana disruption', records show that the Ugweno (or Vughonu) area was known throughout the region. It was ruled by the Shana clan for centuries and became known as the "Mountains of Mghonu", after an early notably famous Shana ruler, from whom it got its name.

It is the skill of the blacksmiths and the resulting valued iron products that made the area popular that eventually led to the influx of foreign groups. Archaeological evidence of iron smithing activities includes items collected by Hans Fuchs in the early twentieth century in North Pare, held in the ethnographic collections of the Náprstek Museum, Prague – refer to link: Iron Smithing Items.

In addition, there are remnants of a specialized irrigation system that expose hundreds of irrigation intakes and furrows that were constructed during this era. Only when the responsibility for irrigation management shifted from patrilineages to village-level committees (post-independence) were these systems negatively impacted towards near collapse.

It is the disruption of the Shana rule that led to miscommunication of history from modern-day communities and misinterpretations of the region and its inhabitants among early European adventurers and historians. In particular, when characterising the skill of the iron smiths based on post "civil war" communities.

==== Suya dynasty (post 16th c.) ====
This era can be categorised as the 'age of discipline and expansion' of the North Pare communities. The Suya overthrew the Shana and instituted a number of reforms that included a strict initiation system and 'one of the great centralized political administration systems' for indigenous communities in Tanzania. This allowed the Ugweno kingdom of northern Pare to expand and come into its own up to the 19th century.

A man known only as Angovi organized the coup, and his son Mranga was instrumental in making the change. Based on his accomplishments, Mranga is regarded as one of Tanzania's greatest pre-colonial reformers. What had previously been clan initiation ceremonies were turned into a complex state institution with unrestricted use of force by him. In order to extend the kingdom over the entire plateau of North Pare, he established a hierarchy of councils, appointed a sizable number of subordinate officials, and then dispatched his sons to govern the various districts.

About eleven generations ago, Shimbo, a powerful ruler of Ugweno, finished this process of expansion. Among his achievements was the incorporation of Usangi, which became the sole district governed by the Sangi clan, a group distinct from the Suya. Therefore, there was a paramount chief (Mangi Mrwe) at the head of the Ugweno state, who was supported by a number of councils (chila), ministers (wanjama), and district chiefs (wamangi).

==== Bwambo dynasty (c. 1600s) ====
It appears that at least one group of people, known as the Bwambo, moved south and settled on the southern plateau of South Pare during the crisis that occurred in Ugweno. There are hints that the Bwambo brought the various groups that had settled close to the Shengena (the highest peak in Pareland) together into a single clan (via the initiation grove or mshitu). The Bwambo society continued to organize itself based on kinship for nearly five generations.

But a number of religious shrines were created to unite the populace when the area grew too big to be governed in this manner. Eventually, a state ritual emphasizing territorial boundaries over kinship was adopted by a ruler named Nguta, who ruled the Bwambo country eight generations ago. This proved to be an effective solution to the issues facing the growing community.

One of the biggest threats to the Bwambo unity was their rapid expansion, but another was outsider groups invading their territory. Many groups of people arrived on the Pare Mountains between twelve and eight generations ago, primarily from the Taita Hills in the east and the Nguu Mountains and Usambara in the south. There were also some groups from the Maasai Steppe, including the Mbugu, the majority of whom were to relocate to Usambara.

Four clans that had fled Taita during a famine ten generations ago—the Safu or Mbofu famine—were among the new arrivals. They established four chiefdom groups, some of which were formed by organizing the clans that had emigrated outside of Bwambo territory and some of which were carved out of Bwambo territory. The four groups were the Mjema in Mamba and Gonja, the Nkeni in Hedaru, the Mhero in Chome, and the Mbaga in Mbaga. Of these four groups, only the Nkeni and the Mjema of Mamba were directly encroaching on territory that belonged to the Bwambo. This invasion coincided with the Bwambo's success in emphasizing territorial chieftainship over ritual leadership predicated only on kinship concepts. Eight generations ago, during Nguta 's reign, the Bwambo territory had grown from Mamba and Bwambo to Suji and Tae. It was extended further into Vunta, the northern region of Hedaru, by Nguta 's son Mwejikongo.

The rivals of Nguta and Mwejikongo were alarmed by their victories, as they were at that point attaining ceremonial dominance due to rain-making and kuhoja, the paranormal ability to shield people, domestic animals, and crops from illnesses and other disasters. The Bwambo therefore had no way of competing with these new ruling groups in terms of recruiting followers. It is said that both of them had capable leaders during this time. The Mjema 's Naguvu invaded the Bwambo 's territory from Mang'a and annexed Kiranga, their eastern district. Hedaru or Tanda was overrun by Mnandi of the Nkeni, who also drove Mwejikongo out of Vunta. It is said that the Bwambo union was entirely destroyed because of the harassment that even the central province of Bwambo experienced. Three chiefdoms, Bwambo, Suji, and Tae—were to emerge from the Bwambo 's remaining territory after the seventh generation.

The political structure established by the Bwambo was altered in a number of ways with the arrival of the rain-making rulers of South Pare. The only office held by the Bwambo below the mumwa that was separate from the ruler (mfumwa) was that of mlao, who served as a lineage head's go-between for the ruler and the subjects. The ritual rulers appear to have realized once more how important it is to have a variety of middlemen since they are now imposing their will on different clans. As a result, there were multiple walao standing in for the interests of different clans, and one of them was chosen as the chief minister by the mfumwa after becoming his trusted mnjama.

Unlike North Pare that unified culturally as well as politically because, in addition to speaking the same language (Kigweno), all of its members were subject to a single, centralized initiation process; South Pare was a community in a distinct sense. It had several independent clans and at least six small states in terms of politics. All these groups, however, belonged to a single cultural system. They had a single language (Chasu), freely engaged in a single initiation system, and maintained a system of diplomatic consultation that involved the dispatch of messengers bearing the unique royal symbol, kimalisa (the royal whisk), in addition to continuous economic cooperation through the rotating market organization. Two events occurred in the latter part of the eighteenth century that contributed to the closer relationship between the two communities: first, the South Pare community expanded to include Middle Pare, and second, communication between the North Pare and South Pare communities was established.

==== Kizungo kingdom (c.1750s) ====
Middle Pare's population was populated by both migrations from Ugweno and South Pare as well as new settlers from the south (the Zigua country). The primary political link was with Mbaga in South Pare, where the ruling family was well-known for producing rain. The environmental factor that has left Middle Pare without enough rain or water is where the story actually starts. As a result, the recently established Kizungo kingdom in Middle Pare dispatched a man named Isagho to Mbaga to ask the rain-making ruler, Novu, for assistance. He described his challenges. He was certain that Kizungo would soon be overrun with people, and that they would also require a ruler, so he asked Mfumwa Nzovu to send him a son to live with him there. Novu was very happy.

This custom states that this incident happened roughly six generations ago. Mbaga was one of South Pare's most powerful chiefdoms at the time. It had continued the centralization process inside its borders by appointing members of the ruling family to serve as district rulers and establishing a "bureaucracy" of commoners at the court, which were methods first employed in Ugweno much earlier.

It had also amassed a military force supported by mbiru, or tribute and other payments due to the rain-maker ruler, and defeated the might of the stronger clans. Novu was able to extend his state into a new area as a result. Indeed, it is said that the rite that was performed for his son Kikwa (prior to his being sent to Kizungo) anointed him as a ruler as well as a rainmaker.

==== Mbaga kingdom (late c.1700s) ====
For Mbaga, this meant expanding the chiefdom into Middle Pare because Mbaga had to continue serving as the ceremonial center where Kikwa and his lineage had to go in order to replenish their ability to produce rain. But in reality, Mbaga refrained from extending its chiefdom into Kizungo. It is accurate to say that the Kizungo rulers kept returning to their ceremonial center in Mbaga. Actually, though, Kizungo split off into its own chiefdom.

Politically speaking, this was how the South Pare chiefdoms had adapted their swift growth to their local circumstances. A multiplicity of political units followed the expansion of the political scale due to the fractured nature of the plateaux. On the other hand, Middle Pare was a social and cultural continuation of South Pare. Around the same time, a Zigua family had established a second chiefdom under the Zigua name on a different hill called Vumari, close to Kizungo. The two chiefdoms adopted Chasu language and actively participated in the South Pare initiation system.

There are several reasons for the attachment to South Pare. First, a look at Middle Pare's current genealogy structure will show that, while some individuals came from North Pare, the majority of the population there relocated from South Pare. Second, newcomers were encouraged to participate freely by South Pare's initiation system. In contrast to the Ugweno initiation institution, which was closed to outsiders, South Pare initiation rites were administered by individual clans, who were obligated to make them accessible to anyone who complied with the ritual requirements. This eliminated the need for any clan to pay for an initiation ceremony each time a new member needed to be initiated.

The second Mbaga expansion was a pivotal moment in history because it started a process that eventually brought the communities of North and South Pare together. According to legend, this expansion happened while Nzovu was still in charge of Mbaga, most likely not long after Kikwa relocated to Kizungo. The idea originated in Usangi, a southern Ugweno district that, as we have seen, was given over to a Wasangi lineage that was unrelated to the Ugweno royal line.

This arrangement had not caused any problems under powerful central rulers. However, it so happened that the southern districts acquired some autonomy during a string of feeble rulers between eleven and seven generations ago, which in Usangi meant autonomy from the Wasuya who ruled Ugweno. Usangi was the first to rebel against a more powerful ruler named Minja when he attempted to bolster the authority of the central government during the seventh generation back. Usangi, one of the ten or eleven districts of Ugweno, lacked the strength to contend with Minja. Fortunately, though, Mbaga's reputation was already well-established, and the Usangi ruler turned to Mbaga for assistance.It signaled the beginning of the process by which North Pare would integrate into Asu culture.

The Wasangi received troops from Mbaga twice during the protracted conflict to aid in their efforts to drive the Ugweno "bureaucrats" out of Usangi. The Mbaga people's involvement in Ugweno affairs had two significant effects. Initially, a large group of South Pare people moved to North Pare, which is in the northern region of Usangi, to serve as a barrier between the Wagweno and the Wasangi.

In a community that had previously spoken Kigweno, this also meant the introduction of Chasu-speaking groups. It marked the start of the process that would see North Pare become a part of Asu culture. One could argue that the non-royal lineages brought from South Pare to North Pare during this time were assimilated into the Ugweno community rather than the other way around. Numerous individuals embraced the Ugweno initiation system and attained full social integration. However, it was these integrated groups that contributed to the spread of Chasu throughout North Pare.

In turn, the Wambaga chiefdom of Usangi's prestige throughout the nineteenth century was to support this acculturation process. Second, the Usangi district saw the formation of two distinct and autonomous chiefdoms. The Wambaga's involvement in Usangi meant more to the Wasangi than they had anticipated, even though the Wasangi themselves achieved independence from Ugweno with Mbaga's assistance. Prior to being sent to Usangi, Chasimba, also known as Madiva, was duly ordained in Mbaga as a rain-maker and ceremonial leader, and he had led the second army of Mbaga.

He was recognized by the Wasangi as a rainmaker. However, the Wasangi leaders decided to acknowledge the Wambaga as rulers over regions settled by their followers, while the Wasangi would continue to rule over the remainder of Usangi, to avoid the possibility of the rainmakers seizing control of the entire chiefdom. The Wambaga were prohibited from participating in North Pare's initiation system in order to ensure that they would not acquire excessive power in Usangi. As a result, in order to complete their initiation rites, the Wambaga ruling clan's members and their devoted followers in Usangi had to travel to South Pare.

Thus, North Pare and South Pare had partnered in two ways by the start of the nineteenth century. Socially, the Ugweno system had been infused with a significant South Pare component. The North Pare system was being penetrated by a number of South Pare individuals, despite the Wambaga chiefdom in Usangi continuing to be distinct. Second, the creation of two competing chiefdoms in Usangi caused pain for the Ugweno kingdom. When new elements entered the picture in the 1800s, Usangi served as the entry point for an invasion of Ugweno.

=== The Chagga states period (c.1790s-1880s) ===
Prior to 1800, the Pare people possessed market systems that made it possible for both members of their own society and outsiders to engage in different kinds of trade. These exchanges took place in the fixed border markets, which were established especially to accommodate the need for trade with neighboring peoples, or in the internal rotating markets.

Foreign trade was primarily with three groups: the Shambaa, who had developed a special trade in skins and livestock out of necessity to hunt for a ritual antelope called mpaa from the Pare Mountains; the Chagga in the north, who derived most of their iron from the Pare Mountains; and the Maasai, who also obtained iron from markets specifically organized for them on the western plains. The Pare received livestock in return for their articles in each of these transactions. We still lack sufficient evidence to support the theory that the Pare visited markets in their neighboring countries, but it is still conceivable.

Due to growing demand from Kilimanjaro, the iron trade in Upare intensified towards the end of the eighteenth century. It is well known that there existed a rivalry among some Chagga kings, which led to an increased focus on military organization and weaponry production. Since the era of Mangi Mashina and Mangi Orombo, the blacksmiths of Mamba, Kilimanjaro, have developed a specialty in producing weapons on a large scale.

To meet this demand, the blacksmiths of the Chagga states had to use the smelters' products on the Pare Mountains to a greater extent. It is not necessary to believe that this has caused the Pare to undergo significant organizational change. Even though the smelters had to put in more effort to produce more iron, the same lineages that had previously controlled iron production continued to do so. In markets under the direct authority of the rulers, trade persisted.

Nothing suggests that the smelters' standing in Pare society changed, despite the fact that they amassed more livestock. The reason for the rivalry between the Chagga rulers during this specific era is more important for this discussion. It is likely that there was a link between this rivalry and the growth of long-distance trade from the coast to the interior of the Pangani river basin, though more research in Kilimanjaro is required to confirm this.

=== The slave trade period (c.1810s-1880s) ===
The late 1860s saw a significant shift in the situation. In order to meet the rising demand on the coast, Swahili and Arab traders were not only searching for ivory, but also for human cargo. Coastal traders were attempting to establish connections with Pare Mountains political elites by arming them with weapons that would enable them to launch raids on other communities and seize captives for commercial purposes. Evidence of Swahili and Arab traders can be found throughout Upare, with the exception of the chiefdom of Mamba in South Pare, which was shielded from the outside world until almost the end of the period.

=== The Sambaa colonies (c.1860s-1900s) ===
In what is now Southern Same District and Mkomazi National Park; colonies of Shambaa and Zigua were established at the same time on the camping stations on the eastern plains. The most well-known of these colonies were Hedaru, Makanya, and Membe on the western route, which met at Same, and Kihurio, Gonja, and Kisiwani on the eastern route. When the Germans intervened, the process of founding Shambaa colonies was still ongoing. In 1890, the Lembeni colony in North Pare had just been established, and the Same colony had barely been around for ten years. The colonists from Shambaa served as intermediaries in the caravan trade between the interior and the coast. Due to their presence in the Pare country, nearly every village in many mountainous areas was involved in the trade.

On Pare society, this growth of economic activity had a profound effect. In general, it sparked an unprecedented competition among the established lords to control this particular trade. Headmen of villages and district leaders made an effort to operate independently of the established hierarchy. This tendency toward secession resulted in a multiplication of independent political units. For instance, the process of fragmentation produced as many as fourteen political units in Hedaru, one of the smallest chiefdoms.

This generalization is corroborated by the fact that the districts and chiefdom of Mamba in South Pare remained intact over the course of the time, despite the late entry of coastal and Shambaa traders. The traders had a good opportunity in the kingdom of Ugweno, where two independent chiefdoms had already been established, one against the other. Actually, Usangi was one of the first—if not the most—successful slave trading hubs on the Pare Mountains.

It would be incorrect to assume that the Shambaa and Zigua contact had only negative effects. Important societal repercussions resulted from Shambaa's coastal influence and expansion into the Pare region. Taking the lead from the Shambaa and Zigua colonists, the Pare for the first time in their history started to consider their plains as places where people could live. The Shambaa introduced Swahili style houses and the village settlement pattern to the Pare region. Additionally, the Shambaa were responsible for the dissemination of coastal cultural influences like the spirit possession cult and the Swahili language.

=== Coastal caravan trade period (c.1860s-1880s) ===
In order to be close to the caravan route, Kengia, the ambitious Wambaga ruler, relocated his capital to the eastern side of the plateau. A slave market was set up close to his court, and slaves from all over North Pare were brought to trade there. Kengia's power appeared to be overwhelming for a while, both in Usangi and in the southern Ugweno districts.

But soon, a few traders also made their way to the Wasangi chiefdom's court. Battles and raids The Wambaga and Wasangi waged constant wars and raids until colonial rule took hold. The trade rivalry caused the royal clan, which had been united for many generations, to break apart, which had an effect on most of the Ugweno people. In the south, Kisangara and Sofe were the first two districts to break away. reated close to Usangi, and following the passing of the final powerful monarch known as Ghendewa, the northern region was ultimately split into two sections.

Periodically, Pare kings dispatched delegates to gather tribute from the marketplaces in a manner akin to that of the mountains. Only in the far north of Ugweno (North Pare) was direct trade contact established with mountain people. Given that it was the area of Ugweno (Ngofi) that bordered Kilimanjaro and had forests that offered elephant hunting opportunities comparable to those on Kilimanjaro, this was by no means an accident.

Therefore, it made sense for Kilimanjaro's coastal traders to expand their operations to Ugweno. Von der Decken met Msuskuma in 1862; he was a trader from Wanga, a coastal town, and he was in charge of an expedition with "two wives and thirty well-dressed and well-equipped men." The Baron was to discover that Muskuma's mother was then living in the northern Ugweno region of Ngof, where he had a longstanding connection. The Muskuma only bought ivory that had been collected by the Ugweno people, but he considered himself to be an elephant hunter. It is interesting to note that some Ugweno were taking advantage of this opportunity and searching as far south as Mbaga in South Pare for ivory by the time von der Decken passed through the area.

But despite everything, Pare society had not yet seen much transformation.The ivory trade had not grown to be a significant political force and had barely affected the northern region of Ugweno. Plains markets merely represented an extension of the market system, in which everyone was able to engage.

Trade missions were likely organized from the coastal towns between Mombasa and Pangani to the Mount Kilimanjaro region by the start of the nineteenth century. Rebmann traveled to that area in 1848 under the guidance of Bwana Kheri, a well-travelled caravan leader who had led multiple trips from Mombasa to Kilimanjaro and even farther afield to Arusha, Iramba, Ugogo, Ukimbu, and Unyamwezi. After four years, he told Johann Ludwig Krapf, his colleague:

"Ivory-traders have to pay two dollars by way of duty (for the Sultan of Zanzibar) on every forasula (equivalent to thirty-six pounds weight) that comes from the Wadigoland; and that if it comes from the Jagga (Chagga states) and Usambara the duty is four dollars; if from Uniamesi twelve dollars."

It is clear from this description that ivory was making its way to the coast from Kilimanjaro. Assuming that the trade began at the end of the eighteenth century, we can also assume that control over this trade played a role in the rivalry between Kilimanjaro's rulers.

Although it is implausible to suggest that Rongoma was an immigrant from the coast, K. Stahl claims that there is evidence for the presence of coastal traders at the court of Rongoma in Kilema during the same period as Mashina and Orombo. If these hypotheses are right, then this expansion of the contact scale in the Pangani Valley area led indirectly to the rise in the demand for iron.

Up to the 1860s, the Pare's only involvement in this trade directly consisted of providing food for the caravans. As a result, new markets were established along the caravan routes that passed through the Pare country's eastern and western plains, regions that the Pare had not previously settled in. An impromptu market was held after caravans would call for Pare sellers from the mountains by emitting a familiar sound, such as a gunshot in the nineteenth century, upon arrival at the various camping-stations.

By the 1880s, the entire Pare nation had been divided into small chiefdoms, each of whose leaders was vying with one another to take part in the slave trade. By focusing on the economic competition, it is clear that the rulers of the Pare region were ignoring their traditional social roles. There is even proof that the legal system was frequently abused to force one or both parties into slavery. However, the collapse of the authority structure could get to the point where even the established rulers would be unable to keep their monopoly on the economy.

Strong commoners were also able to arm themselves and launch raids. In the 1880s, women were only permitted to visit markets with an armed escort from their husbands. The chiefdom of Chome in South Pare, where more political power had been left in the hands of clan leaders due to an emphasis on the ritual functions of the ruler, was the worst example of this type of decline.

Therefore, the economic rivalry did not lead to fragmentation; rather, it provided a chance for some commoners to band together into armed groups and conduct slave raids both inside and outside of their own chiefdom. Kibonda is the term for this overall breakdown of law and order in the Pare Mountains. Along with it came the fear that kept people from going about their daily lives as usual. When cultivation was done, some of the crops were destroyed by raids because it was neglected. This chaos is blamed for the historic famine known as Mnyime on Pare Mountain (roughly 1888–1892) instead of a severe drought.

Enlargement of scale can be used to summarize how the Pare Mountains' political system broke down. During the nineteenth century, the Pare were drawn into a more extensive trading network than had previously existed. On the inside, though, established leaders were engaging in a wide range of new endeavors without changing the structure of the political system they were using. As a result, the inner organization of the political units suffered as the outer circles of Pare contact grew. This type of internal issue was adjusted for in each unit during the breakdown.

=== The German colonial period (c.1880-1918) ===
Three factors contributed to the preparation of the groundwork for German rule in Upare: the economic rivalry of the latter part of the 1800s and the ensuing fragmentation. Initially, it produced a multitude of political factions incapable of waging a military defense against external meddling. Second, when it became apparent that the slave trade was doomed, the economic rivalry between the contending rulers turned into a political race for credentials. Thirdly, the Germans had access to people who could be utilized for district administration in the same manner as the coastal Arab and Swahili akidas thanks to the Shambaa colonies on the Pare plains.

German authority was unknown in Upare until 1891, despite the fact that German rule in Tanganyika had begun in 1885. Since the days of von der Decken, a number of Europeans had traversed the Pare plains, but none had ventured to the mountains. Nevertheless, a treaty signed in 1885 between Mangi Rindi of Moshi and Karl Jühlke, a friend of Carl Peters, placed the entire Pangani hinterland under German control.

In the course of Abushiri's 1888–1890 war of resistance, the Germans were committed to maintaining the Pangani route based on this understanding. Commander Dr. Rochus Schmidt was dispatched by Captain H. von Wissmann, the imperial commissioner in German East Africa in 1890, to maintain the caravan route and "pacify" the nation's interior. Schmidt was confident that Semboja would maintain the caravan route open, so he was content to raise the German flag at Mazinde and Vuga. As a result, Mazinde was turned into a German garrison, and since 1887, Kilimanjaro had been home to another station.

Events resulting from a crisis on Kilimanjaro were to signal to the Pare the impending arrival of a new era. News had arrived at the coast that Mangi Sina, from Kibosho on Kilimanjaro, had defied German rule by removing a German flag from his hut. This occurred shortly after von Wissmann had completed crushing the Abushiri resistance along the Tanga coast. Thus, in order to battle Mangi Sina, he personally oversaw an expedition to Kilimanjaro in 2 January 1891. The Pare people were affected by the expedition's march across their plains. The name "Changoma," which means "one who enjoys or likes the drum," is how Wissmann is remembered.

The expedition was led by a military band, whose drums could be heard over a great distance, which gave rise to the name. When Wissmann and his friends were camping at different stations on the plains, it is possible that they traveled through parts of Upare. Wissmann halted at Kihurio, where he removed Kihungwi—who was no longer friendly with Semboja—and installed Shangari, Kihungwi's brother, in his place. He also placed at Kihurio the first Shambaa akida, a certain Kivuma who had come from Mazinde.

Wiss-mann and his army are reported to have set up camp for three days at Kisiwani. They were asked to get involved in the Wasangi-Wambaga conflict in Usangi at Butu, which is close to Lake Jipe. It is thought that Captain Johannes, a friend of Wissmann's, went to Usangi and gathered the Wambaga and Wasangi chiefs, giving them orders to coexist peacefully in their separate territories.

The Germans had limited knowledge of the Pare Mountains' wealth at this time. However, Wissmann's expedition was extremely significant because it informed the Pare chiefs that "Changoma" had brought a new decree prohibiting the trade in slaves. For the majority of them, it was evident that anyone hoping to hold onto power needed to reconcile with the Germans. Consequently, all the rulers of fragmented territory on the Pare Mountains engaged in a "scramble" for certificates in the two years that followed Wissmann's expedition. While some made contact with German expeditions on the plains, others traveled to Moshi, while the majority went to Mazinde.

The widespread issuance of certificates, even to those who had few subjects to govern, exposed the ignorance of the German officials. A resident of Butu named Matandiko received a certificate despite only having five subjects! But, the goal of the German authorities' actions was to maintain internal peace. They could hardly afford another Abushiri war in the interior due to German colonial policy, and they lacked the manpower and the time to travel to the mountains and confirm these claims.

Perhaps the most dramatic example of German ignorance of Pare politics is Usangi, where the Wambaga and Wasangi had been at odds for over a century. Because the Wambaga had driven the Wasangi leaders, Sangiwa and Makoko, from their homeland, Wissmann's expedition had intervened there. Nonetheless, the Wasangi people's sense of insecurity persisted despite the agreement reached by Captain Johannes. Consequently, it is said that Sangiwa and Makoko fled to Mwembe in South Pare shortly after the settlement. There, they convinced the head of the Shambaa colony of Mwembe, Fungo Mwanamata, to travel with them to Butu. Whether they were preparing an attack on the Wambaga in Usangi is unclear.

However, early in August 1892, the second German military expedition to Kilimanjaro, led by Deputy Governor Colonel Fredrich von Schele, passed through the region while they were in Butu. Sent to the lowly Meli of Moshi, who had nearly destroyed a German punitive party from Marangu (also on Kilimanjaro), the expedition was sent. Sangiwa and Makoko communicated with the expedition at Butu. The Wambaga leaders, Naguvu and Magwero, were called to Butu, but the message was never delivered because the messengers were Wasangi supporters.

Lastly, it is reported that Captain Kurt Johannes went to Usangi with a small group of punitive people. After making an attempt to defend himself, Naguvu and his allies withdrew into a tunnel with their animals. The Captain gave the order to light fire in the entrance to drive out the group, believing there to be a sizable one inside the tunnel. In actuality, though, the tunnel suffocated them all. When the individuals were removed and it was discovered that they were mostly women and children, it was a very horrific scene. Naguvu and all of his sons were among the few men who died in the tunnel; Sabuni, on the other hand, had escaped the chaos caused by the German invasion.

The Wasangi were successful in this. However, the issue was still unresolved. Now it was Magwero's turn to travel to Moshi and attempt to persuade the Germans to support the Wambaga. Magwero was able to convince Johannes, who was now in charge of the Moshi station, to come to But in order to try Sangiwa and Makoko for killing his father and mother during the raids that preceded the German intervention with the help of Marealle of Marangu.

Most accounts from eyewitnesses indicate that the two leaders would have been hanged by Johnannes if Shundi, the Swahili interpreter and friend of the Sangiwa, had not intervened to protect them. Finally, Sangiwa and Makoko received fifty strokes apiece as a form of corporal punishment in front of the public in Moshi. They were then instructed to return to Usangi and to remain in their individual chiefdoms. Consequently, the Germans had administered a shock treatment to the Usangi issues. They had not realized the nature of the distancing between the two groups or its magnitude.

One could argue that the Germans could get away with anything they did because the Pare's dispersed units were so weak. However, this is not at all accurate. Protecting their political interests had been the initiative of the Pare leaders. They perceived a certain benefit in this since it essentially kept the immigrants on the plains or in distant stations where their impact on the lives of their own people would have been minimal. One incident suggests that the Pare were prepared to defend their interests if they felt threatened, regardless of how dispersed their political units were.

In 1897, a German Lutheran missionary from the Bethel Mission in Usambara arrived in Hedaru, where this incident took place. To compete with the Roman Catholics (the Trappists), the Lutherans sent Pastor Roehl to Upare to stake a claim to a large mission field. Mfumwa Mntindi gave him land on the Tanda Hill in Hedaru, and even helped with the house's construction. A year later, divination revealed that the mission house was the cause of a cattle disease (possibly rinderpest) that had recently broken out, prompting the Pare of Hedaru to rebel against the mission.

Fortunately, no one was living in the mission house at the time; the missionary used it when he occasionally visited Upare. Everything within the house was destroyed when the house was torn down. Mntindi and his people showed that they would stand up for the rights of their own community, even though they peacefully submitted to the German expedition dispatched from Mazinde to punish them. To say that Pare rulers had accepted German rule when they hurried to get certificates may be overly broad.

German rule over the Pare Mountains had little effect until 1900. Akida Kivuma had shown to be unpopular and ineffective. An attempt was made in 1898 to enhance the system by assigning two assistants (sub-akidas), one at Kisiwani and another at Makanya, and by substituting Komba for Kivuma. At Kisiwani, another garrison was set up. The primary goal of all these modifications was to address the issue of tax collection, which was introduced in 1898. However, the administration was still in need of an effective akida, and none was discovered until after 1900.

The Germans found it convenient to split Upare into two sections after establishing district administration: South Pare administered by Usambara and North Pare administered by Kilimanjaro. Pare did not have a single district until 1928 Under the British.

=== The British colonial period (c.1918-1961) ===
Following Germany's defeat in World War I, the British seized control of the colony and named it Tanganyika. By 1920, the population of South Pare (now known as Same District) was estimated at 22,000 comprising an ethnic group called Asu or Pare who are speakers of Chasu or the Pare language. They are patrilineal and were in several areas organized into small chiefdoms.

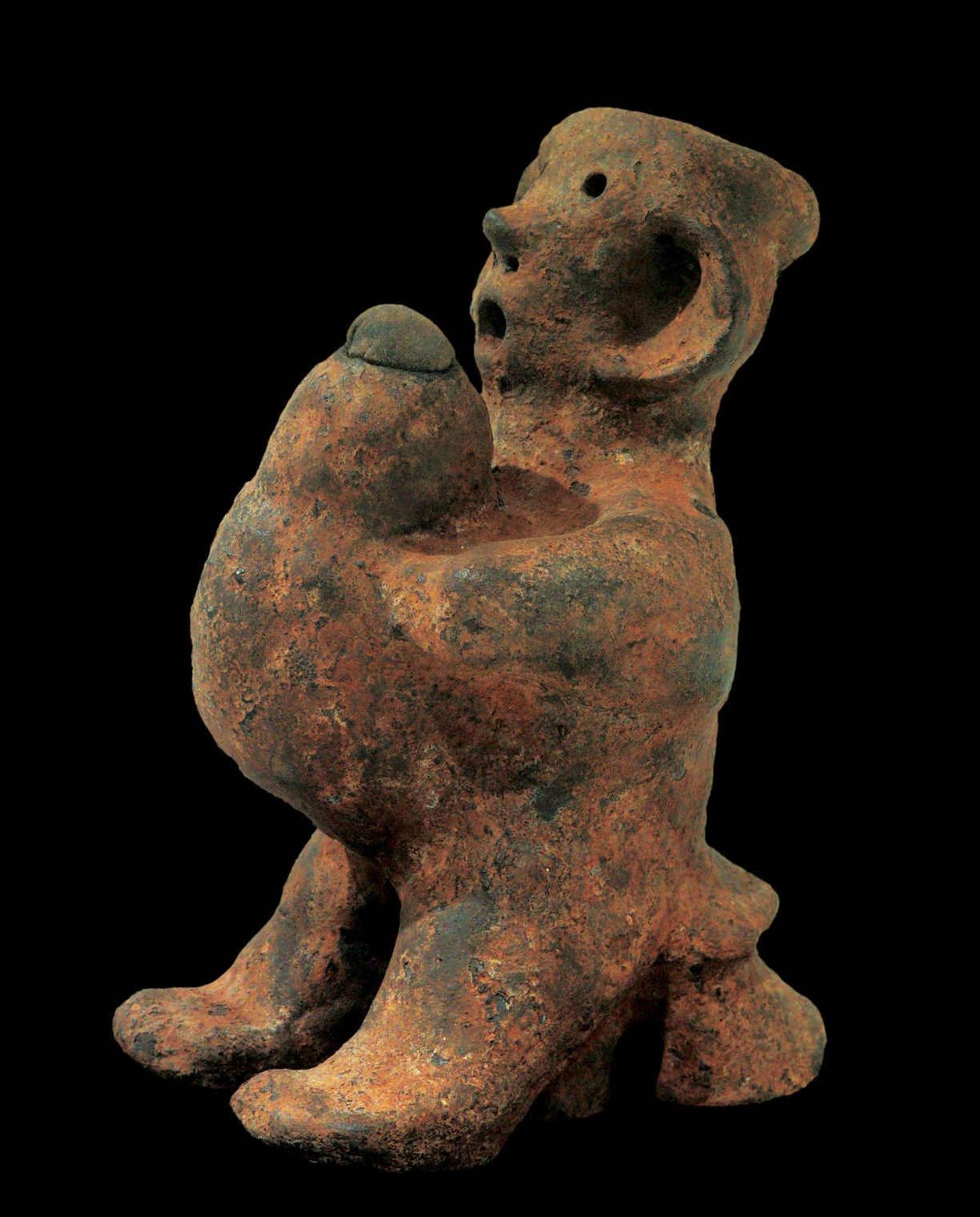
Anthropomorphic figurine; 19th century-20th century; terracotta; from Tanzania; Museo de Arte Africano Arellano Alonso (Valladolid, Spain)

=== Independence movement (c.1940s-1962) ===
The Pare Union formed in 1946 was one of Tanzania's first ethnic-based nationalist movements to begin activism against the colonial system. Among many grievances, was the exploitation through the production of export crops, particularly Sisal and Coffee. Like many other ethnic-based political groups in Tanganyika, The Pare Union then became part of the Tanganyika African Association (TAA), which later became the Tanganyika African National Union (TANU) in 1954. This prevented groups like the Pare Union from forming into full political parties that were ethnic in orientation.

Moses Seenarine writes of the contribution of Pare women in the struggle: 'The Pare women's uprising in northwest Shambaai, Tanzania, occurred in early January 1945 and continued with demonstrations into 1946, involving thousands of women. It began in Usangi, one of the chiefdoms, when the district commissioner arrived for discussions with the local chief. A crowd of hundreds (if not thousands) of women appeared, demanding an explanation of mbiru, a system of graduated taxation. When the commissioner tried to leave without addressing the women, they became enraged and mobbed the assembled officials. Two days later, women surrounded the chief's house singing songs, and ultimately stoned officials and battled police.' The Mbiru protest by the Pare people refusing to pay the colonial tax was eventually led by Paulo Kajiru of Mamba. The Pare eventually managed to defeat this tax system and went back to the flat rate of tax in 1947. This remains as an important historical event in Tanzania.

=== Post-colonial impact on the Pare people ===
The disruption of Pare indigenous practices based on historical knowledge during the colonisation era failed to appreciate the cultural sustainability of Pare communities. As documented in archival sources and oral histories, the alteration of post-colonial land management in the North Pare Mountains had an effect on environmental conditions.

Colonial forest management and water policies were all abandoned, affecting the villages in many aspects, resulting in environmental degradation and a decrease in management capacity. It has been argued that the symbolic meaning of cultural practices, in the management of trees for instance, was more than rooted in local beliefs but also had a wider political and economic influence, as well as dissemination of knowledge for cultural preservation.

== Pare economy ==
From the 1940s, the Parelands flourished from the growth of the coffee economy. Consequently, modern Parelands are, by Tanzanian standards, quite prosperous, as its infrastructure of roads, electricity, telephones, and piped water supply attests. The area's main produce is tea, coffee, sisal, and cinchona. Rice is grown in the swampy plains.

An older infrastructure of irrigation furrows, stone-lined terraces and sacred forests lies alongside these newer technologies and shows that the Pare landscape has been carefully managed for centuries. In 1890, for example, a German geographer praised the stone terraces of the area as being similar to European vineyards and stated that the northern Pare irrigation system was a "truly magnificent achievement for a primitive people" It has been argued that the establishment and management of the irrigation infrastructure system depended on institutions that could contribute to knowledge of the development of irrigated agriculture.

== Culture/Tradition ==
=== Traditional food ===
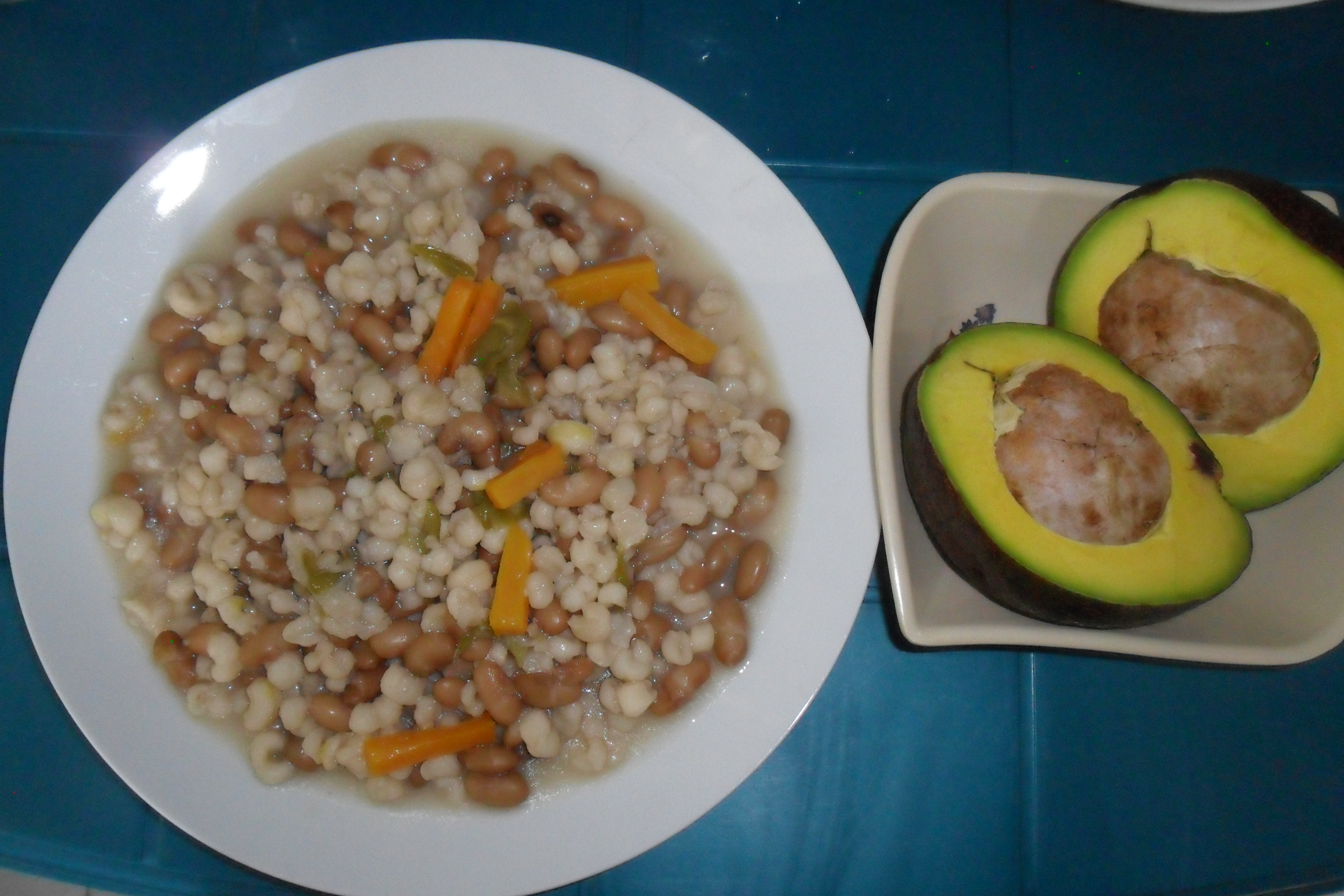
Makande served with avocado

Makande is a typical dish of the Pare tribe and is popular throughout Tanzania. The dish is a stew of maize, red beans, onions, garlic, tomatoes, and chicken stock. It is usually prepared on Friday and lasts through Sunday evening, giving people more time to socialize during the weekend without worrying about cooking. The food is kept in a large clay pot on damp ground so it stays cool.

Kishumba is a traditional Pare dish of banana cooked with red beans and crushed to make something similar to mashed potato.

Vughai is a traditional Pare dish of hard porridge prepared with banana, cassava or maize flour (or a mixture of both). It is served with vegetable, beans or meat/fish/chicken stew (or both if available). When served with meat/chicken, it is considered as a welcoming dish for guests.

Special foods are also given to women after giving birth, to aid in their quick recovery.

=== Traditional medicine ===
Before the introduction of western medicine, there were certain diseases that were cured using traditional medicine. When Lutheran missionaries were actively introducing Christianity and western style medicine in north Pare and later in south Pare from the early 1900s, it was acknowledged: "The Pare people did not embrace the modern institutions introduced by the missionaries as readily as the Chaga. The stronger position of local healers meant that traditional medicine was never rejected as an inferior or backward tradition …”. For children who used to suffer from Wintu (mouth sore), a fungal disease thought to come from the mother's breast, they were treated by giving them sheep's milk instead of breast milk.

Kirumu, kirutu, and kinyoka (eye infection of the newborn) may be neonatal conjunctivitis. The juice of leaves from a plant called mwore was used as a cure.

Mtoro (diarrhea) made 'the child as thin as firewood' and ash of the root of wild banana was administered orally as its medicine.

The most prominent traditional belief within the Pare community was when a baby's milk teeth grew from the upper jaw; they believed it to be a curse to the society and thus killed the baby by throwing them off a large rock with a steep slope facing down a mountain.

Pare people are known to have a variety of medicine for all sorts of diseases, largely enabled by the fertile area with natural vegetation and an unpolluted land with few people.

=== Traditional appearance ===
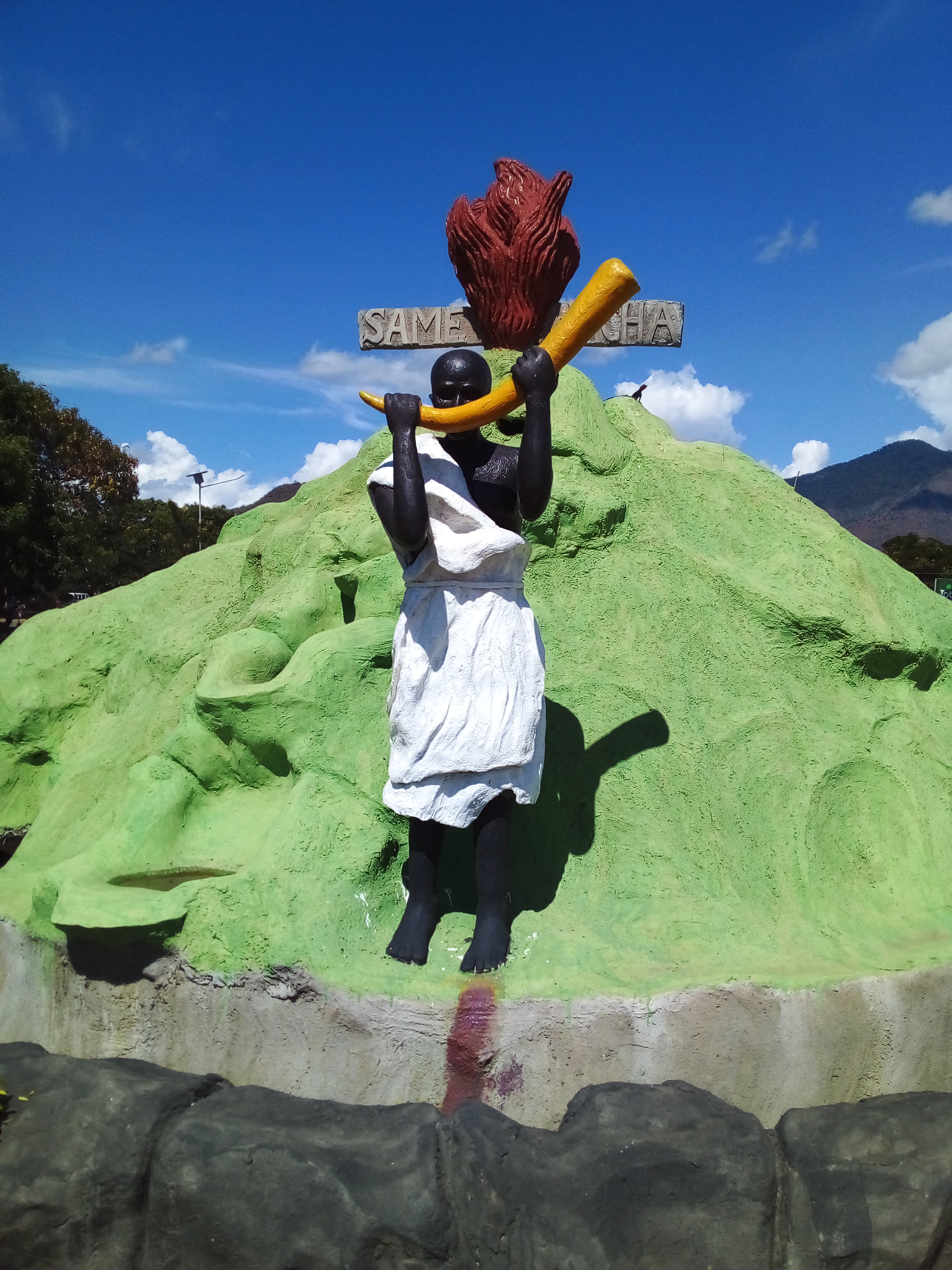
Statue at Same roundabout depicting a Pare figure in traditional clothing

Traditionally, the Vaghonu were marked by a black streak running from the middle of the forehead to the nose. Unmarried warriors were characterised as muscular and their bodies were plastered with grease and a red clay. They had different hairstyles: fully shaven, cut at the crown, worn in a thatch hanging down their necks, and twisted into thin dreads (most common). The men carried spears and shields and wore a piece of cloth or hide that hung across their breasts.

In nearby Shighatini, missionaries managed to take a picture (in the year 1902) of the Pare men in traditional clothing; refer to link: Pare Men Wearing Traditional Clothing.

The women wore a garment of hide fastened around their waist. They had spirals of iron wire as arm and leg ornaments. They also wore large earrings made of beads, thick necklaces of brass and iron-decorated wooden ear stretchers.

=== Traditional housing ===
The Pare built two types of round houses: (1) They used a wooden frame to create a cone-shaped house, which was likely fastened out of ropes from tree trunks, with a pitched roof made of plant fibre stretching down to the ground. Refer to link: Round House 1 (2) The wooden frame covered with leaves is only used as a roof in this second model, but the frame is covered with cementitious soil available in the Pare Mountains to create round walls. Refer to link: Round House 2.

=== Sacred sites ===
The origins of a clan can be traced through the location of its sacred sites. For instance, despite the Shana having migrated to other parts of Pareland, their sacred sites remain in Ugweno, signifying their place of origin. Sacred sites can be referred to as Mpungi (for lineages), Mshitu/Mtiru (for clans), and Kwa Mrigha or Kwa Kivia (for ancestors). At these sites, various tribal ceremonies, customs and/or initiation were performed.

=== Tanzanian cultural contribution ===
- Pare: In Tanzania, referring to someone as "Pare" is synonymous with calling them "stingy" or "cheap". Even during Tanzania's history of economic hardship, the Pare believed in making ends meet by adopting strict budget plans, albeit having insufficient funds. Given their honest and direct nature with respect to their economic circumstances, this has been misinterpreted and stereotyped nationally. However, culturally the Pare just strive to be open and fair, hence a lack of hypocrisy in declaring their finances as modest and incorruptible (despite the odds) is viewed as the right thing to do.
- Msaragambo: The Pare people inherited a difficult land and a mountainous landscape, and the only way they could develop it was through this highly organized mandatory community-based system aimed towards inclusive and sustainable growth known as "msaragambo". The Mwanga District is well recognised for its strong social-cultural legacy of "msaragambo", which promotes collective effort of the community. As a result, social interaction, community awareness, and commitment to collective work are considered reasonably high. This system has been widely adopted throughout Tanzania.
- Makange: Robert Makange was the pioneer of the popular Tanzanian food referred to as "chicken makange" at his Tropicana Club on Nkrumah Road in Dar es Salaam, during Tanzania’s pre-independence period. The term "makange" is now commonly used throughout Tanzania in reference to any fried meat mixed with vegetables, thick stew and at times, spices.

== Places of interest ==
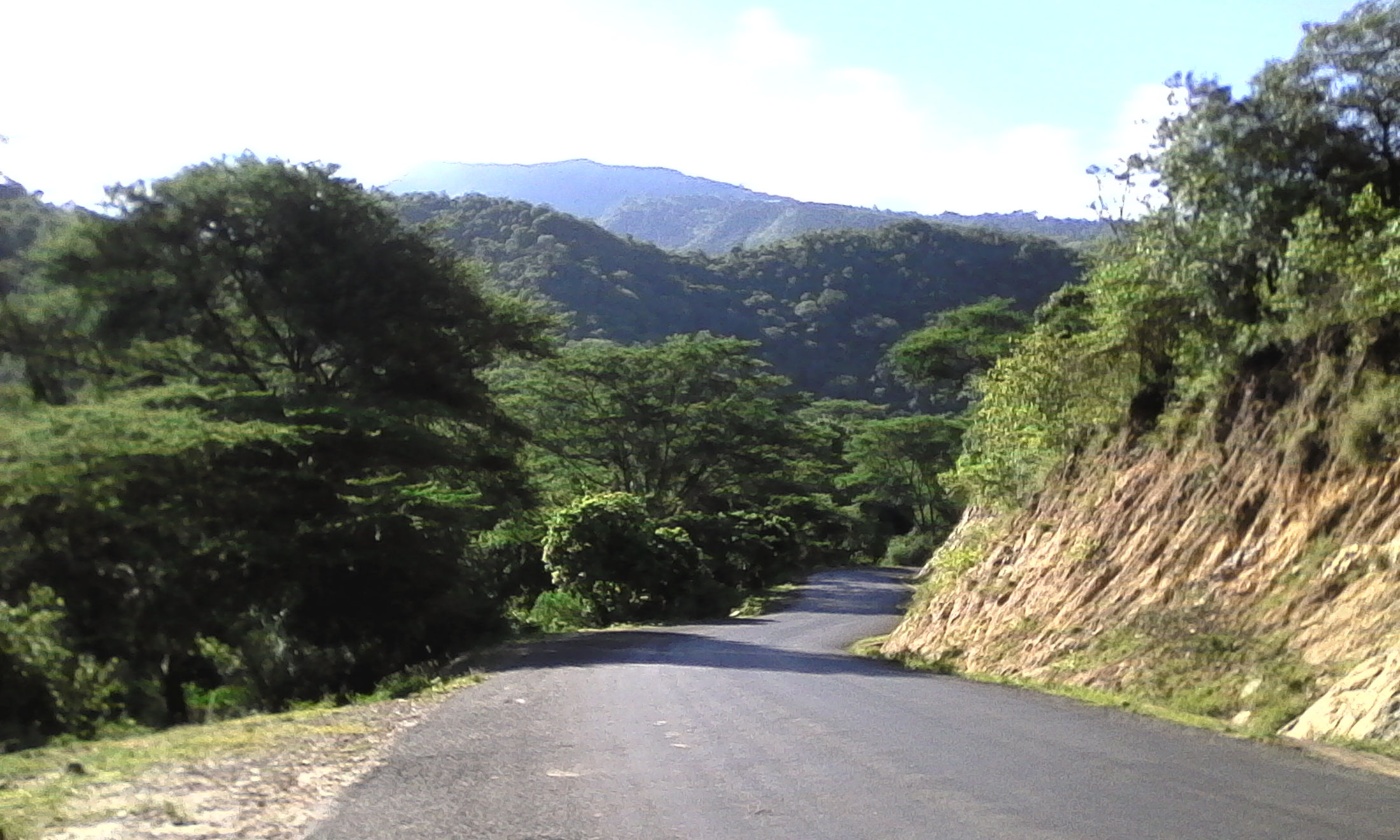
Road up towards the north pare mountains

- Ugweno
- Usangi
- Suji, Kilimanjaro
- Lake Jipe
- Mkomazi National Park
- Shume
- Shengena Natural Forest is part of Eastern Arch Mountain. In this forest there are ponds whose water is milky or black in colour; with multi-coloured soil that can even be goldish or pinkish in appearance.
- Ndungu irrigation scheme, supplies rice to the Kilimanjaro and Tanga regions.
- Kihurio, adjacent to Ndungu, is also known for rice cultivation.
- Mamba Giti is where the S.D.A Church was founded in East Africa.
- Mbaga where there is also Ibwe la vana (Ibwe, meaning stone) or mkumba vana used to kill innocent children due to wrong beliefs.
- Gonja where there is a waterfall known as NDURUMO of about 400 m along the Hingilili river, Ibwe leteta, sacred forests, Gonja Lutheran hospital, Shengena forest, Bombo local market, and hiking routes (Gonja Maore – Vuje village – Shengena peak) to the highest point in the Pare Mountains.
- A rock with a shape similar to a human nose in Mshihwi, known as Ikamba la fua (Nose Rock).
- A rock in southern Usangi on the slopes of the hills toward the kwakoa village known as Ibwe lavyana i.e. the rock where innocent children were killed in this area.
- River Mshasha at Usangi where there is a hanging tree that produces fresh water throughout the year.
- Kindoroko Mountain with a natural rainforest (forest reserve) that is home to blue monkeys and many seasonal tropical birds.
- Southern region of the Pare Mountains to see the south Pare white-eye (Zosterops winifredae).

== Notable Pare & people of Pare descent ==
=== Politics, Diplomacy and Statesmanship ===
- Cleopa Msuya
- Asha-Rose Mtengeti Migiro
- Angellah Kairuki
- Jumanne Maghembe
- Halima Mdee
- David Mathayo David
- Ombeni Sefue
- Anne Malecela
- Anna Senkoro
- Dora Mmari Msechu
- Tuvako Manongi
- Zuhura Yunus (Wikipedia Swahili): The current Tanzanian Director of Presidential Communications. A former presenter and producer of BBC Swahili Service.
- Sifuni Ernest Mchome (Prof): The current Permanent Secretary, Ministry of Constitutional and Legal Affairs. A former Permanent Secretary at the Ministry of Education and Vocational Training (2013 -2015).
- Gray S. Mgonja: A former Permanent Secretary in the Ministry of Finance.
- Sophia Mjema: The current Shinyanga Regional Commissioner (RC) and the former District Commissioner (DC) for Ilala and Arusha. Former Regional Commissioner of Simiyu and current National Chama Cha Mapinduzi (CCM) Spokesperson
- Togolani Edriss Mavura: Tanzania's ambassador to South Korea. A former Private Secretary to the Minister of Foreign Affairs, Assistant Secretary to Former President Jakaya Mrisho Kikwete.

=== Academics ===
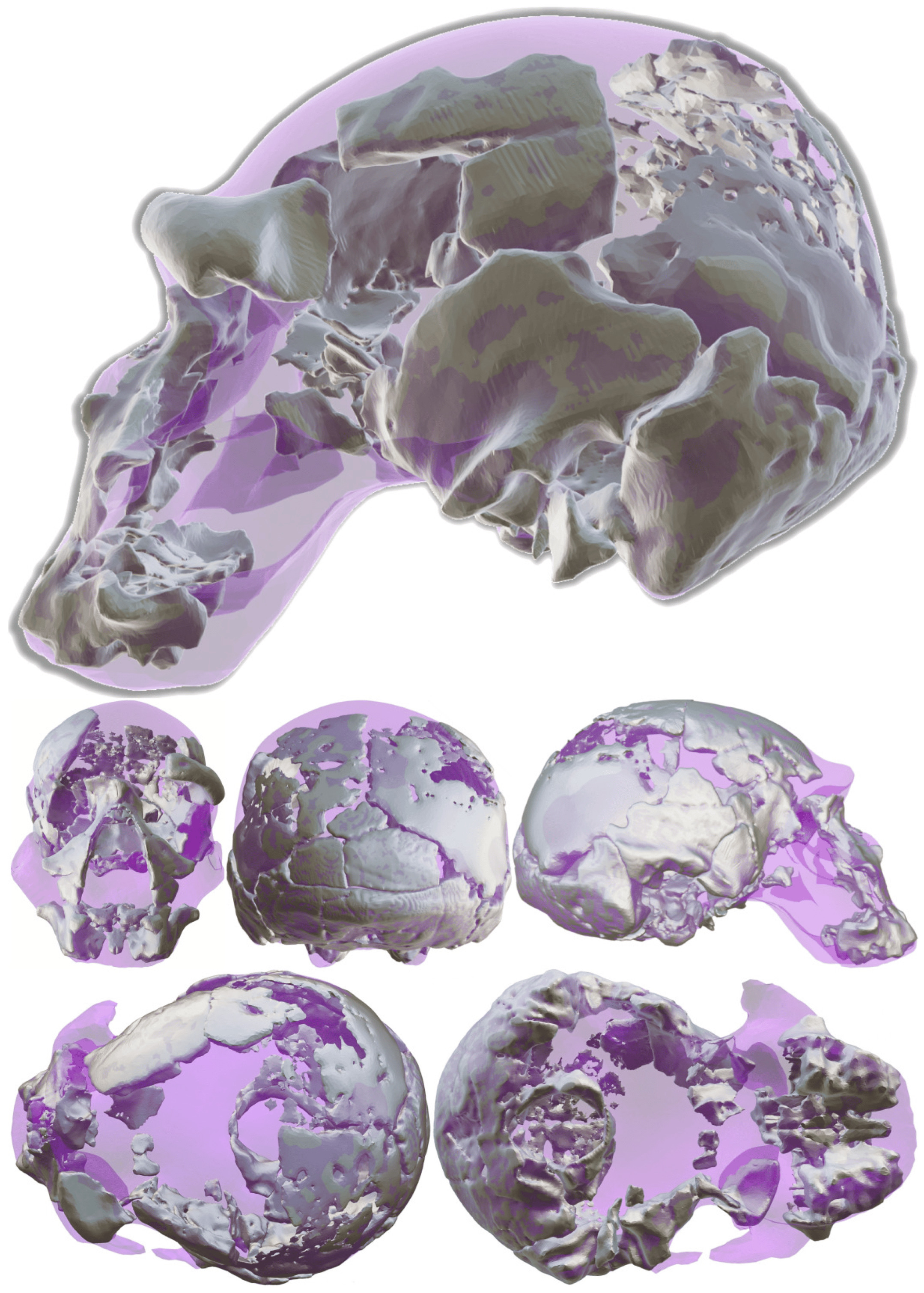
Digital reconstruction of Amin Aza Mturi's Ndutu cranium discovery

- Joyce Msuya
- Flower Ezekiel Msuya
- Amini Aza Mturi
- Sengondo Mvungi
- Mary Mgonja
- Damari Namdori Sefue (née Kangalu): the first Tanganyikan (now Tanzania Mainland) woman to qualify as a teacher in 1931.
- Elitabu Keto Mshigeni (Prof): A pioneer of botany research in Tanzania. He served as Pro-Vice-Chancellor for Academic Affairs and Research at the University of Namibia, Director of UNDP's Regional Africa-wide Zero Emissions Research Initiative (ZERI) Project, and Vice Chancellor at Hubert Kairuki Memorial University.
- Alfeo M. Nikundiwe (Prof): A distinguished researcher in Zoology and former Head of Department: Zoology and Wildlife Conservation at the University of Dar es Salaam. Also notably the first Principal of University College of Lands and Architectural Studies (UCLAS) in Dar es Salaam.
- Godwin Mjema (Prof): Director of the Economic Research Bureau (Department of Economics) at the University of Dar es Salaam and a retired Rector of The Institute of Finance Management (IFM). Also appointed as a board chair for UTT Microfinance.
- John S. Mshana (Prof). Vice Rector for Academics at Kigali Institute of Science and Technology (KIST) in Rwanda. A former Chief Administrative Officer of the University of Dar es Salaam, Principal of the University College of Lands and Architectural Studies, Director of the Institute of Production Innovation and Head of the department of Mechanical Engineering.
- Yunus Daud Mgaya (Prof): Director General of the National Institute for Medical Research, and a former Executive Secretary of the Tanzanian Commission for Universities.
- Abel Yamwaka Mreta (Dr): Late linguist and expert on the Chasu language and former Head of the Department of Linguistics at the University of Dar es Salaam.
- Robert Nathaniel Mcharo Mshana (Dr): The Robert N Mshana Memorial Award has been named after him. A specialist in mycobacterial immunology who worked in Ethiopia, Gabon and Côte d'Ivoire; developed policies and guidelines on behalf of the OAU/STRC in Lagos, Nigeria; contributed to WHO/TDR's R&D activities; served on the Steering Committees for Immunology of Leprosy (IMMLEP), Immunology of Mycobacterial Infections (IMMYC) and Vaccine Discovery Research (VDR).
- Venance Fupi (Dr): A former Chief Government Chemist (Tanzania) from Kisangara Juu Village.
- Abdulkarim Mruma (Prof): A Tanzanian geologist who serves as Professor at the University of Dar es Salaam. He has also served on the board of directors for Tanzanian and foreign-owned mining companies, including the Williamson Diamonds Ltd, the Tanzanian Royalty Exploration Corp., the State Mining Corp., the National Development Corp., etc.

Grace Msangi (Eng.): Assistant Lecturer at the Department of Environment and Sustainable Development, Mzumbe University

=== Police/Army ===
- Ben Msuya (Major General): Led the 19th battalion in 1979 (as a Lieutenant Colonel). It was the invasion forces that led to the fall of Kampala and the collapse of the Idi Amin government.
- Peter Orgenes Mkwizu (Major): Head of engineers during the 1979 war, which resulted in the fall of Idi Amin's government.
- Elangwa N. Shaidi: The first Tanzanian Inspector General of Police (IGP) 1964–1970.
- Philemon Mgaya: The fourth IGP in Tanzania 1975–1980. He also served as Senior Superintendent of Police (SSP) and Dodoma Regional Police Commander (RPC) in the early 1960s and served until the mid-1960s.
- Ahmed Msangi: The deputy director of criminal investigation in Zanzibar. A former Regional Police Commander (RPC) in Mbeya and Mwanza, a police spokesperson and Deputy Commissioner of Police (DCP).
- Uzia Makange (Major): A former advisor of Military Affairs to President Yoweri Museveni.

=== Entertainment ===
- Vanessa Morgan
- Vanessa Mdee
- Nandy
- Ekwa Msangi
- Mimi Mars
- Raymond Mshana: Media creative (TV and radio), voice over artist and TV copywriter.
- Roma Mkatoliki: Rapper, songwriter and activist.
- Adam Mchomvu: Radio presenter, brand manager, hip hop artist and songwriter.
- Gilbert Munga: Standup comedian and writer.

=== Business ===
- Benedict Mberesero: Established one of the oldest and known bus companies in Tanzania, Ngorika Bus Transport Company Limited, trucking as well as land/property investments.
- Erasto Msuya: The late gemstone dealer (notably, in Tanzanite) with high-end properties in Moshi and Arusha, who was famously assassinated.
- Ridhuan A. Mringo (Eng): Board Chairman of Mwanga Hakika Bank and CEO & Managing Director of Derm Group.

=== Notable personalities ===
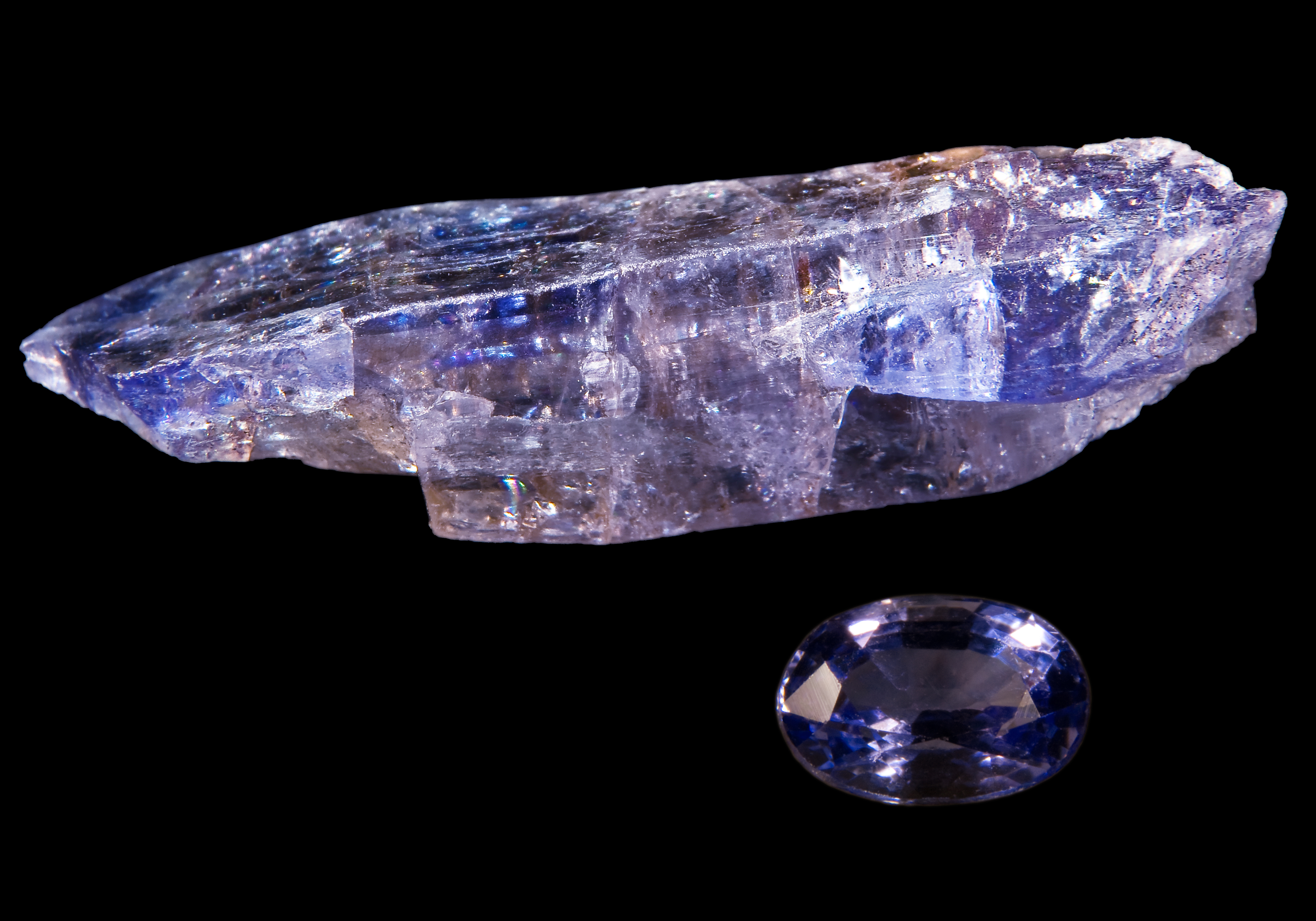
Jumanne Mhero Ngoma discovered Tanzanite in 1967

- Brenda Msangi
- Josaphat Louis Lebulu
- Jumanne Mhero Ngoma
- Paulo Kajiru Mashambo: Leader of the historical Pare pre-independence protest to repeal the mbiru (graduated tax rate) system in the 1940s.
- Gerald B. Mturi: Executive Secretary of the Tanzanian Chamber of Minerals and Energy (TCME).
- January Msoffe (Judge): He served as a Justice of the Court of Appeal of Tanzania; Judge of the High Court of Tanzania; and Judge in Charge of the Dodoma High Court in Tanzania.
- Esther Mkwizu: A former chairperson of the Tanzania Private Sector Foundation (TPSF).
- Elly Elikunda Mtango: A former Ambassador and Dean of the African Diplomatic Corps in Japan.

=== Royalty ===
(Mfumwa or Mangi refers to Chief/King in Asu/Chasu and Gweno, respectively)

- Mfumwa Heriel Makange (Chome); Mfumwa Kibacha Singo (Same); Mfumwa Sabuni Naguvu (Usangi); Mfumwa Shaban Mtengeti Sangiwa (Usangi); Mfumwa Mbwana Yateri (Gonja); Mfumwa Daudi Sekimanga Manento (Mamba); Mfumwa Yusufu Mapombe (Mbaga); Mfumwa Chauka Saidi Sadi (Hedaru); Mfumwa Rubeni Shazia (Suji); Mangi Minja Kukome (Ugweno, south); and Mangi Abdallah Sereki (Ugweno, north).

== See also ==
- Pare language
- Pare Mountains
- Lake Jipe
- Peopling of the Kilimanjaro Corridor
- Kilimanjaro Region
- Battle of Kilimanjaro
- Mount Kilimanjaro
- Chaga people
