= Msuya =

Msuya is a surname commonly used in Tanzania. Notable people with the name include:

- Cleopa Msuya (1931–2025), Tanzanian politician
- Flower Msuya (born 1959), Tanzanian phycologist
- Joyce Msuya (born 1968), Tanzanian microbiologist and environmental scientist
