= Lake Jipe =

Lake in Kilimanjaro Region, Tanzania and Kenya

- Location within Kenya Location within Africa

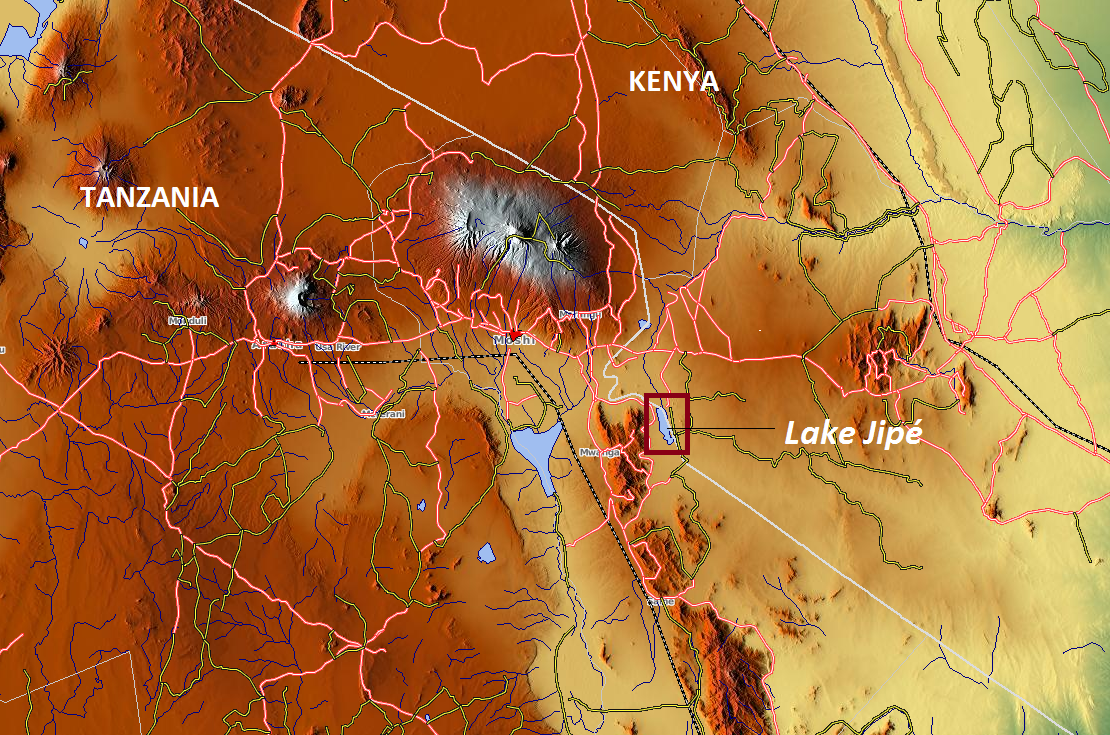
- Coordinates: 3°27′0″S 37°43′48″E
- Primary inflows: Lumi River
- Primary outflows: Ruvu River (→Pangani River→Indian Ocean)
- Basin countries: Kenya and Tanzania
- Max. length: 19 km (12 mi)
- Surface area: 30 km^{2} (12 sq mi)

Lake Jipe is an inter-territorial lake straddling the borders of Kenya and Tanzania. On the Kenyan side, it is located south of the village of Nghonji while on the Tanzanian side, it is situated within Mwanga District, in Kilimanjaro Region. The lake is fed mainly by the Lumi River, which descends from Mount Kilimanjaro, as well as streams from the North Pare Mountains, being on the leeward side. The lake's outlet forms the Ruvu River. Kenya's unfenced Tsavo West National Park protects part of the lake's northern shore, while on the Tanzania side Mkomazi Game Reserve is nearby. The lake is known for its endemic fish, as well as water birds, mammals, wetland plants and lake-edge swamps, which can extend 2 kilometres (1.2 mi) from Jipe's shore.

== Geography ==
The lake is accessible from the Tanzanian side via the B1 Highway from the village of Kifaru, about 40 kilometres (25 mi) south of the Kilimanjaro Region capital of Moshi. Jipe covers an area of roughly 30 square kilometres (12 sq mi), and measures approximately 12 miles (19 km) long by 3–4 miles (4.8–6.4 km) broad. Jipe is a shallow backwater of the Lumi river, which afterwards becomes the Ruvu River, and enters in the Nyumba ya Mungu Reservoir. After joining there with the Kikuletwa the stream flows as Pangani River in the Indian Ocean at Pangani. The lake lacks a current as the river that flows in, turns round and flows out again. Its water is only drinkable after it has been well boiled and skimmed. On its southern bank, the mountains of Ugweno rise 6,000–7,000 feet (1,800–2,100 m), contrasting markedly with the opposite shore, which is a flat plain, but little raised above the lake. Mount Kilimanjaro's Kibo Peak is viewable from the lake.

== Demographics ==
Some 120,000 people depend on the lake for their livelihood. The inhabitants of villages surrounding Lake Jipe are mainly involved in fishing, agriculture and animal husbandry. To the south-east of the great mountain is the little agricultural colony of Taveta. Ki-taveta is the language used by the Bantu half of the population, and Maasai is the language of the remainder. Ki-gweno is the dialect of the northernmost area of the Pare Mountains known as Ugweno (Vughonu to its inhabitants) to the south of Lake Jipe. Lake water is used for irrigation of the surrounding farmlands.

== Fauna ==
The probability of long-time isolation from other wetlands is suggested by a fish endemic to the lake, the Jipe tilapia. Jipe's waters are teeming with big fish, principally siluriforms and cyprinoids. Jipe forms a biodiversity rich ecosystem also known for the water birds that frequent its reedy shores; these include storks, egrets, pelicans, spur-winged plovers, ducks, and Egyptian geese. Lesser jacana and the African swamphen are common on the lake and Madagascar squacco heron, black heron, African darter and African skimmers are often seen. The vicinity of the lake is frequented by herds of game. Hippopotami and Nile crocodiles are plentiful.
