= Suji, Kilimanjaro =

Suji
- Village
- Interactive map of Suji
- Coordinates: 4°21′54″S 37°53′45″E
- Country: Tanzania
- Region: Kilimanjaro
- District: Same

Population (2002)
  - Total: 8,072
- Time zone: UTC+3 (EAT)

Suji is a small village in the Pare Mountains, in the Kilimanjaro region of north-eastern Tanzania. According to the 2002 census, the village has a population of around 8,072 (Male: 3,974, Female: 4,098). The latest census conducted in 2022 shows that there is an about 50% decline in population. Both sexes (4,681); Male (2,285); Female (2,396). The majority of the villagers are of the Pare tribe (legend holds that they moved up the mountains as a security measure in a similar way other villages built forts. Their main antagonists were Maasai warriors who they call 'Kwavi'. The village is situated approximately 20 km from Makanya, a town on the main Dar es Salaam - Moshi road. In terms of religion, the majority of the residents are Seventh Day Adventists.

== Transportation ==
Truck used in emergencies

Kilimanjaro International Airport, situated between Moshi and Arusha is the nearest airport. Villagers rely on shuttle minibuses to transport them up and down the mountain. Suji secondary school together with the SDA church own a roadworthy truck. This is used in case of an emergency.

== Amenities ==
Mission church

Church bell

Aerial view of Suji, showing amenities

Suji has electricity and clean running water in most homes. Telephones, (landlines and mobile phones) are widely used, although with interrupted coverage. A few villagers also have satellite television.

The village has the following amenities:

- Local shops and marketplace
- Mission Guest House
- Clinic / Dispensary
- SDA church (From 1903)
- Primary & Secondary schools
- Shamge's Pub
- Eneza's Hotel
- patron's house

=== Education ===
In addition to primary schools, there are 2 secondary school; Suji High School and Malindi Secondary School. Suji High School was officially started on 28 February 1985. The School had two classrooms and four teachers, Singo Andrew K, (the headmaster), Mathayo Fue Mkwizu, Mngale, karani alex and John Kilonzo. Later on others joined the school; Kazani Yonafika Chambi, Mkitunda and Christopher Chambi, to mention a few. In 1988, Suji Secondary School released its first O-Level leavers. It operates under the ownership and management of Seventh Day Adventist Church in North East Tanzania Conference. Suji has along history as primary school, teachers training centre and secondary school. The school was found by the Germany missionaries of SDA Church in 1906. Later developed to become a primary school and teacher training centre in 1926. In 1927 the first qualified teachers graduated with Government Teaching Certificate;it thus, produced the first qualified female teacher in Tanganyika in 1931 namely Ms. Damari Kangalu. The school ceased to offer Teacher Training centre in 1945 and continue as a middle school (Std I-VII) until 1965 when the Government nationalized all primary schools, and was downsized to Std VII. In 1984 Suji community requested the SDA Church to open and run the secondary school. The primary school was relocated. The secondary school was then started in 1985. It was registered in 1987 with a Reg. No. S.283; and later was accepted to be a National Examination Centre No.489. The first form four examination was done in November 1988. In September 1999, Suji attain new status of being a high school. Science then, its enrolment include for one through six. The first form six examination was done in May 2001.

== Hamlets/Townships/Areas ==
- Kirangare
- Malindi
- Chankanga
- Gonjanza
- jamia
- Ngale
- Mng'ende
- Kitunda
- Tae
- Chome
- Bwambo
- Ivuga
- Mpinji
- Myamba
- Parane
- Ndungu
- Chairika
- Heidaru
- Shigati
- Hempungi
- Kisimeni
- Ikondova
- Heivu
- Nkogo
- Mvuteni
- Ninga
- Heirioko
- Mweteni

== See also ==
- Kilimanjaro Region
- Same District

== Sources and external links ==
- Tanzania Government Census 2002
- Suji Seventh-day Adventist Dispensary. P.O. Box 26; Suji, Same; Tanzania
- Suji High School. P.O. Box 351, Same, Kilimanjaro, Tanzania.
- Peace Corps service in Suji
- SDA Clinics
- Birds of the South Pare Mountains
- Suji Village Renewal
- NUI graduates volunteer in Suji
