= Mbugu language =

Bantu language spoken in Tanzania

Mbugu
- Kimbugu
- Native to: Tanzania
- Region: Usambara Mountains
- Ethnicity: 32,000 Mbugu
- Native speakers: (7,000 cited 1997)
- Language family: Niger–Congo?: Atlantic–Congo; Volta-Congo; Benue–Congo; Bantoid; Southern Bantoid; Bantu; Northeast Bantu; Northeast Coast Bantu; Pare-Taveta; Pareic; Mbugu

Language codes
- ISO 639-3: mhd
- Glottolog: mbug1240
- Guthrie code: G.221

Maʼa
- Kimaʼa
- Native to: Tanzania
- Region: Usambara Mountains
- Language family: mixed Cushitic–Pare

Language codes
- ISO 639-3: None (mis)
- Glottolog: None
- Guthrie code: G.20A
- ELP: Mbugu

Maʼa is a Bantu language of Tanzania.

The Mbugu people speak two divergent registers, which have been treated as separate languages by some authorities (e.g. Tucker and Bryan): Mbugu or "Normal Mbugu" (autonym kiMbugu) is purely Bantu, while Maʼa or "Inner Mbugu" (autonym kiMaʼa) consists of Cushitic vocabulary with Bantu morphology similar to that of Shambala and Pare. They share a grammar, to the point that their syntax is identical and a passage in one can be translated to the other simply by changing the content words.

The Cushitic element was identified as a unique branch of South Cushitic by Ehret. However, Kießling (2001) notes a large East Cushitic admixture. Mous presents the Cushitic element as a register of a Bantu language, and identifies it as largely East Cushitic rather than South Cushitic.

== Phonology ==
=== Consonants ===
Normal Mbugu distinguishes 29 consonants. Inner Mbugu distinguishes an additional four: /ʔ ɬ x ^{ŋ̊}x/, for a total of 33. The table below displays the consonants of Mbugu in IPA format, along with Mous' (1995) practical orthography in angle brackets where it differs from IPA.

Table of Mbugu consonants
| | | Labial | Alveolar | | Palatal | Velar | Glottal |
| | | Labial | central | lateral | Palatal | Velar | Glottal |
|---|---|---|---|---|---|---|---|
| Nasal | | m | n | | ɲ ⟨ny⟩ | ŋ | |
| Plosive | voiceless | p | t | | c ⟨ch⟩ | k | ʔ ⟨'⟩ (Note: Only occurring in Inner Mbugu) |
| Plosive | voiced | ɓ~b ⟨b⟩ | d~ɗ ⟨d⟩ | | ɟ~ʄ ⟨j⟩ | ɡ~ɠ ⟨g⟩ | |
| Prenasalized plosive | voiceless | ᵐ̥p ⟨mhp⟩ | ⁿ̥t ⟨nht⟩ | | | ᵑ̊k ⟨nhk⟩ | |
| Prenasalized plosive | voiced | ᵐb ⟨mb⟩ | ⁿd ⟨nd⟩ | | | ᵑɡ ⟨ng⟩ | |
| Fricative | voiceless | f | s | ɬ ⟨hl⟩ | ʃ ⟨sh⟩ | x | h |
| Fricative | voiced | v | z | | | ɣ ⟨gh⟩ | |
| Fricative | prenasalized | | | | | ᵑ̊x ⟨nhx⟩ | |
| Sonorant | | | r | l | j ⟨y⟩ | w | |

The voiced stop series can be realized as either explosives [b], [d], [ɟ], [ɡ] or implosives [ɓ], [ɗ], [ʄ], [ɠ]. According to Mous especially the bilabial is most often an implosive. Ehret describes the series as comprising three implosives /ɓ/, /ɗ/, /ʄ/), but an explosive /ɡ/ at the velar position.

Ehret describes also a prenasalized palatal ⟨nj⟩, and transcribes ⟨č⟩ in place of ⟨ch⟩, standing in Afrasianist phonetic notation for a postalveolar /tʃ/. He notes the consonant /v/ to occur only in the Bantu component of the vocabulary and assumes consonant clusters instead of voiceless prenasalized consonants.

=== Vowels ===
Both registers of Mbugu distinguish five vowels.

| | Front | Back |
|---|---|---|
| High | i | u |
| Mid | e | o |
| Low | a | |

=== Tone ===
Three tones are distinguished in Mbugu: high, low, and falling. Low tone is default (unmarked). High tone is represented with an acute accent ⟨á⟩, while falling tone is represented with the sequence ⟨áa⟩.

== Lexicon ==
Mbugu is noted above all for its lexicon, which as noted is split in two distinct registers: the Bantu-derived Normal Mbugu and the largely Cushitic-derived Inner Mbugu, in earlier descriptions treated as a distinct language in its entirety. Mbugu has thus at least two synonyms for almost every basic concept: a Normal Mbugu word and a semantically exact equivalent Inner Mbugu word. Unlike typical loanword layers, Inner Mbugu has thorough coverage of basic vocabulary and of verb roots. This has given Mbugu notoriety as a case example of a mixed language, especially in the earlier conception where Ma'a would be a distinct language from Normal Mbugu, thus comprising Bantu grammar but little to no Bantu vocabulary.

Several sources are recognized for the divergent Inner Mbugu lexicon. Approximately 60% derive from various branches of Cushitic, including the West Rift languages; an unidentified Eastern Cushitic source similar to Oromo; Dahalo; and possibly also Yaaku and the extinct and unrecorded Taita Cushitic. Many of these can be identified by the appearance of the Cushitic-derived phonemes /ɬ/, /x/ and /ʔ/. Other parts of the Inner Mbugu lexicon are derived also from other languages in the area, such as Maasai (possibly specifically the Parakuyo dialect) and Zigua. Speculative proposals on yet further sources have appeared, such as Carl Meinhof having suggested a West African source similar to Ewe. Directly neighboring Bantu languages such as Shambala (Shambaa) have also contributed recent loanwords to Mbugu, but these are not restricted to Inner Mbugu and might appear in both registers. A number of word derivation means also exist for converting Normal Mbugu words into Inner Mbugu versions. An affix -é is common, and also e.g. conversion of the lateral approximant /l/ into the lateral fricative /ɬ/ has been noted.

The lexicon of Normal Mbugu is, by contrast, typical Bantu and closely akin to Pare, though it too contains recent loanwords e.g. from Swahili.

== Literature ==
- Ehret, Christopher (1980). The Historical Reconstruction of Southern Cushitic phonology and vocabulary. Kölner Beiträge zur Afrikanistik. Vol. 5. Berlin: Dietrich Reimer.
- Mous, Maarten (1996). "Was there ever a Southern Cushitic Language (Pre-) Ma'a?". In Voigt, Rainer M.; Griefenow-Mewis, Catherine (eds.). Cushitic and Omotic languages: proceedings of the third international symposium, Berlin, March 17-19, 1994. Köln: Rüdiger Köppe. pp. 201–211.
- Mous, Maarten (2003). The Making of a Mixed Language: the case of Maʼa/Mbugu. Amsterdam: J. Benjamins Pub. Co.
- Tosco, Mauro (2000). "Cushitic Overview". Journal of Ethiopian Studies. 33 (2): 87–121. JSTOR 41966109.
