= Ugweno =

Area in Tanzania

Coordinates: 3°39′S 37°39′E

Ugweno (or Vughonu to its inhabitants) is an area in Mwanga District, Kilimanjaro Region, Tanzania. It is situated at 3° 39' 0" South and 37° 39' 0" East in the Pare Mountains. The people who live in Ugweno are known as Wagweno (or Vaghonu in the local language) and their common language is Kigweno (or Kighonu in the local language).

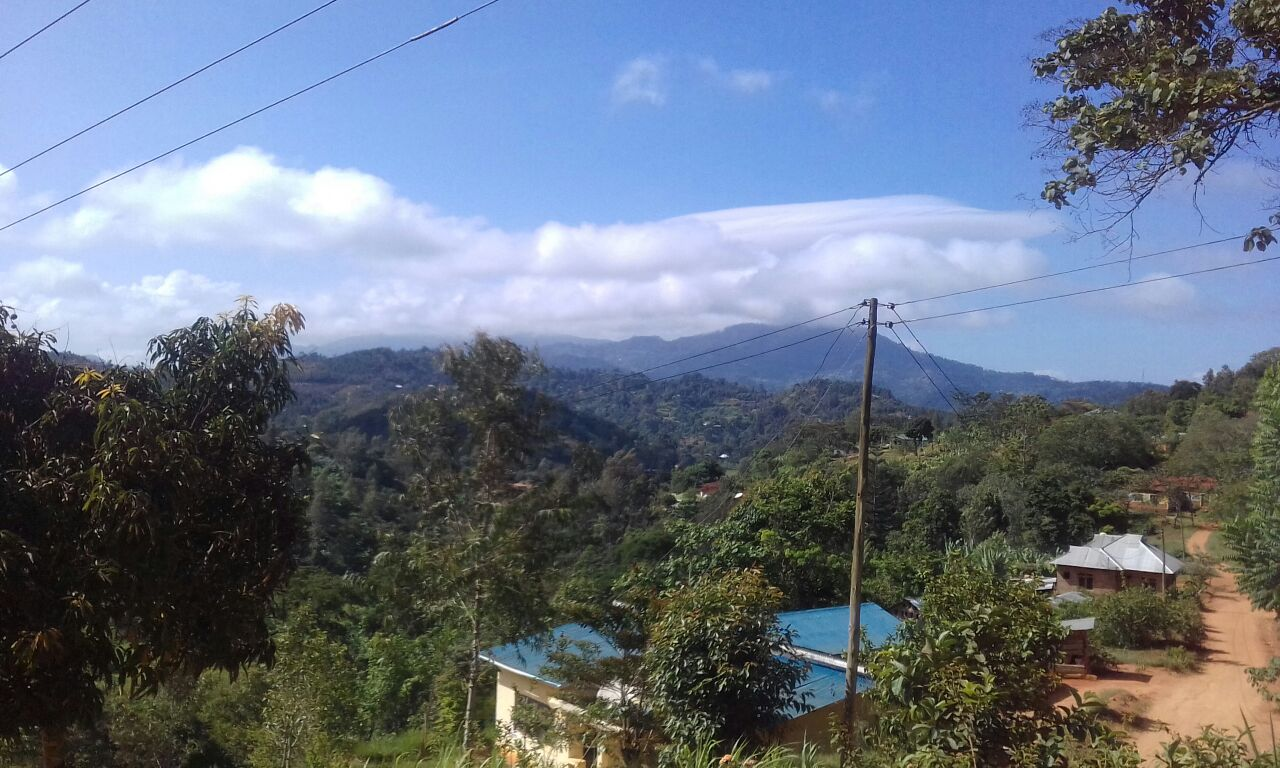
View at the top of the North Pare Mountains of Ugweno

== History ==
The original inhabitants of this area are the Shana clan (blacksmiths). The name Ugweno is derived from a popular Shana ruler, Mghonu, who ruled sometime between the 13th and 15th centuries. During his rule, the area was known as the Mountains of Mghonu as far afield as the Taita region in Kenya.

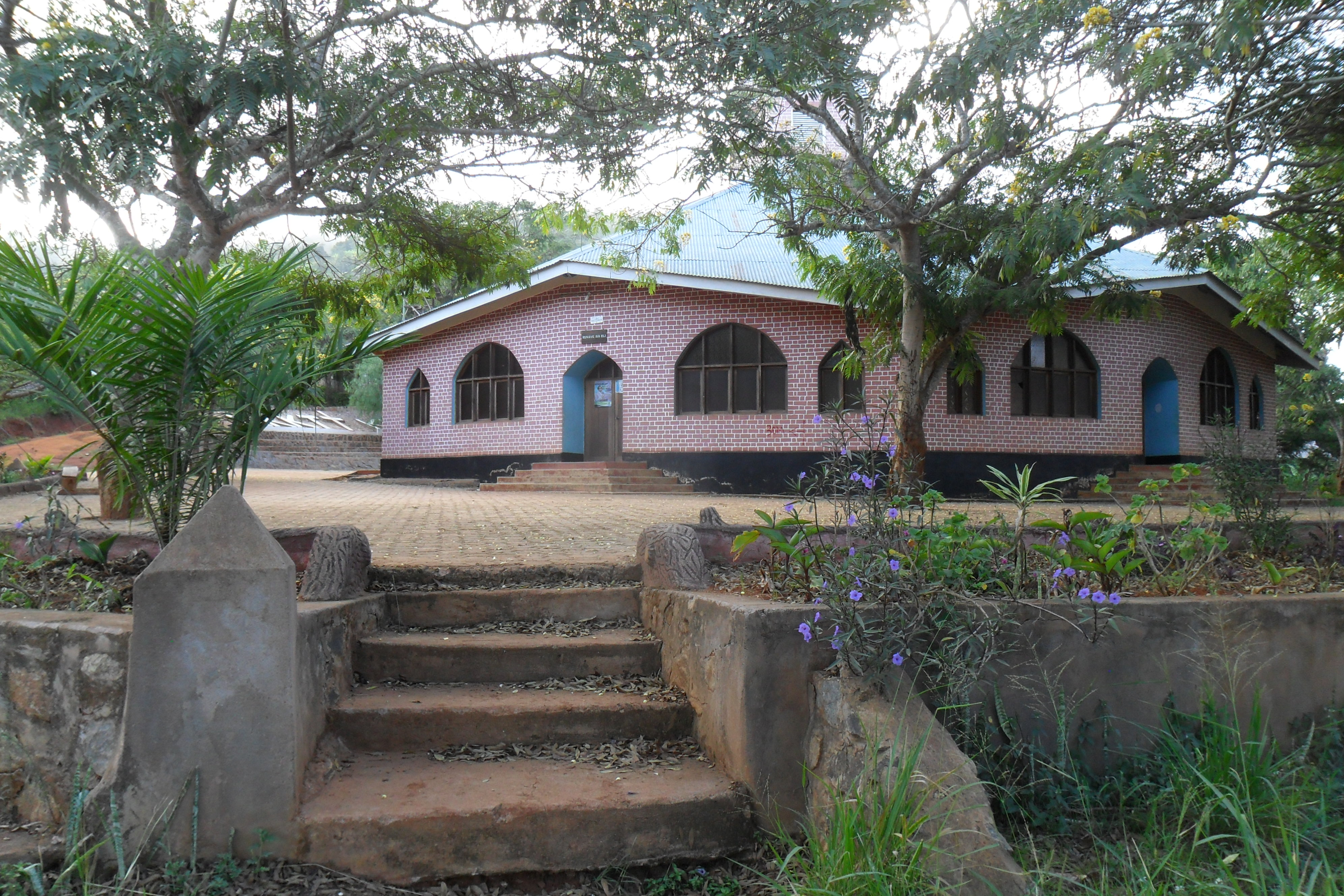
Local church known as 'Kuvave na Eli"

When the Suya clan migrated to the region, ambushing and wiping out almost all of the Shana clan, the origins of the name Ugweno were either less known or purposely forgotten by the new rulers. This led to various theories about its origin. It may be derived from Taita and Voi tribes from Kenya during the migration to the Pare Mountains due to tribal wars in their Kenyan homelands. Before they established settlements in those mountains, they first sent explorers. When the explorers returned, they said "Mringa ua khona", meaning "the rivers produce thunder when flowing", and the name Ugweno was allegedly born.

The Suya clan was responsible for the expansion of the state of Ugweno. After the 16th century, the state stretched as far south as Lembeni at its peak and becameone of the great administration systems for indigenous communities in Tanzania.

Present-day Gweno people are a mixture of all those who came to make the mountains of Ugweno their home. Historically, their ancestors came from Taita, Voi, Chaga, as well as southern Pare tribes. Gweno families trace their roots from various areas, such as the Suya, Sangi and Nzava families. One example is the Odongo, among others, who were summoned by the Suya from the Nguru mountain region of Tanzania to prevent conflicts in Ugweno.

== Culture ==
Kirembwe is their main dish: a mixture of banana and beans, cooked in a clay pot. It can be crushed to create a hard porridge that cools into a cake. Kirembwe is normally prepared for breakfast. Sometimes the mixture is ground and water added to it, making it porridge-like; this is known as kiumbo.

== Economy ==
The area's chief crops are coffee and bananas. It also produces maize and rice, which is grown in the swampy plains.

== Tourism ==
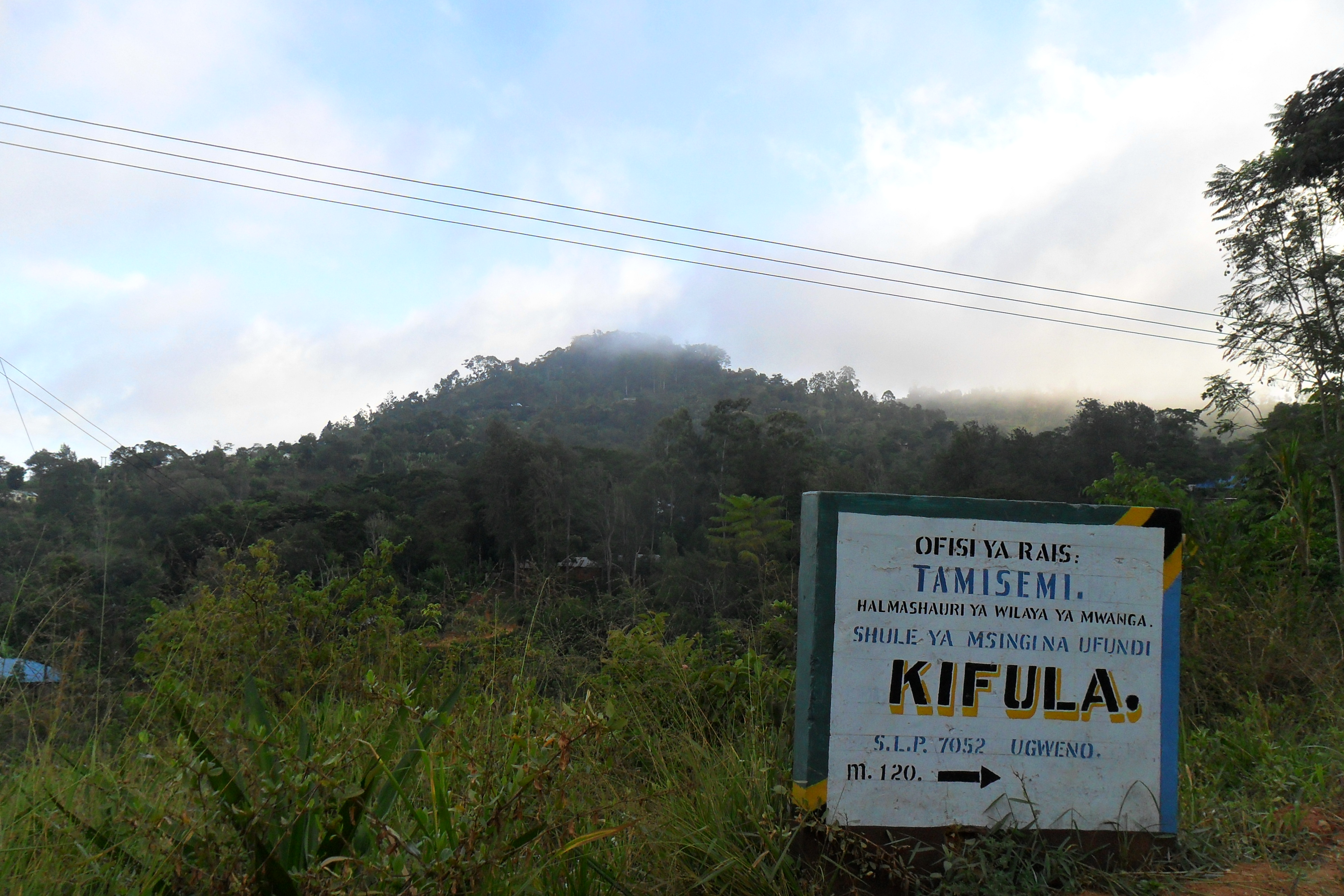
Cloud cover in the morning

Ugweno is situated in the Pare Mountains with clear views of Mount Kilimanjaro and Lake Jipe. This lake is an inter-territorial lake straddling the borders of Tanzania and Kenya. On the Tanzanian side, it is situated within Ugweno, while on the Kenyan side it is located south of the village of Nghonji. The lake receives water from North Pare mountain streams as well as the Lumi River, which descends from Mount Kilimanjaro. The lake's outlet forms the Ruvu River. The lake's shores are protected by the nearby Tsavo West National Park and Mkomazi Game Reserve. The lake is known for endemic fish, as well as water birds, mammals, wetland plants and lake-edge swamps, which can extend for about 2 kilometres (1.2 mi) from Lake Jipe's shore.
