= Usangi =

Former Kingdom in present-day Tanzania

Coordinates: 3.7029371°S 37.65507°E

Usangi View from Kighare

Usangi - Northern Tanzania. Usangi is part of North Pare which consists of Usangi and Ugweno. Usangi is located between Ugweno in the north and Mgagao in Southern Pare. To the west it borders with Mwanga, the current administrative headquarters of Mwanga District, and to the east it faces the Tanzania border with Kenya. Usangi is located on the Pare Mountain ranges which lead up to the Kilimanjaro mountain to the north. The Usangi Kingdom was ruled by the Sangi rulers referred to as Wafumwa (Fumwa being the root word. The rulers ranged from Mfumwa Sangiwa Makoko who died in 1881 up to Mfumwa Shabani Mtengeti Sangiwa who ruled until 1962 when traditional rule was abolished following the independence of Tanganyika in 1961. The Kingdom was briefly ruled by a non-Sangi ruler, Mfumwa Sabuni, before the Sangi reclaimed it and Mfumwa Shabani was crowned.
