= Flower Msuya =

Tanzanian scientist

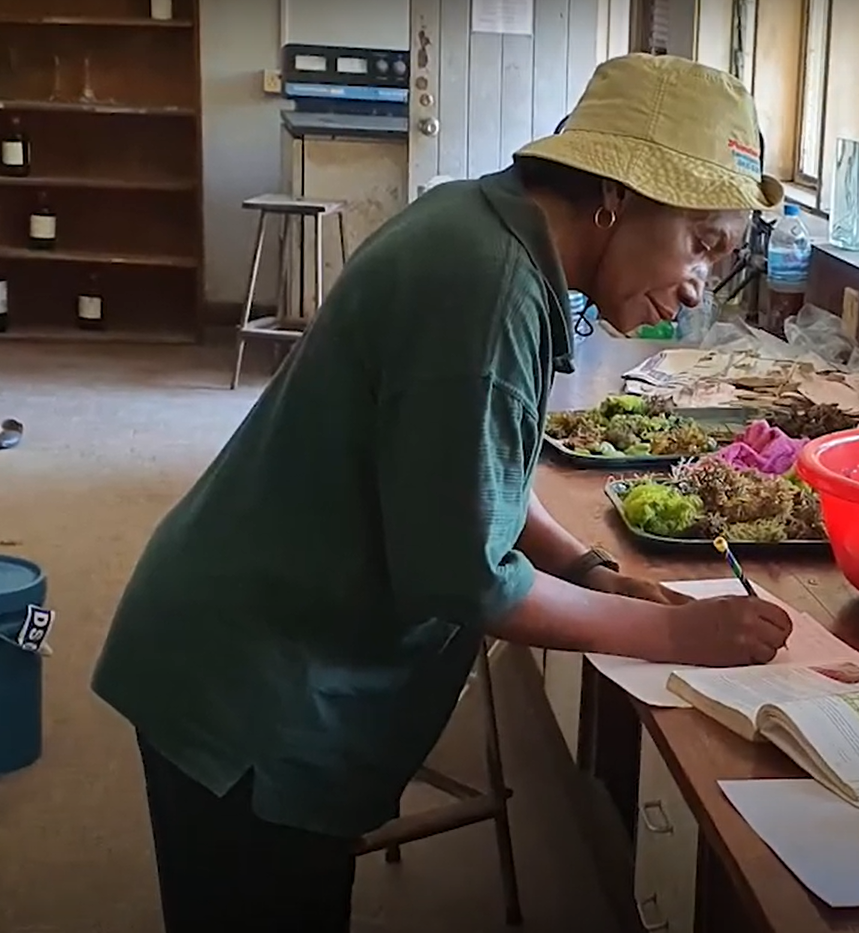
- Msuya displaying algaculture in Zanzibar
- Born: 1959 (age 66–67); Kifula, Tanganyika Territory
- Education: University of Dar es Salaam; University of Kuopio; Tel Aviv University
- Scientific career
- Fields: Phycology, algaculture
- Workplaces: University of Dar es Salaam
- Thesis: The Influence of Culture Regimes on the Performance of Seaweed Biofilters in Integrated Mariculture (2004)

Flower Ezekiel Msuya (born 1959) is a Tanzanian phycologist. She specialises in algaculture (seaweed farming) and integrated aquaculture.

== Early life and education ==
Flower Ezekiel Msuya was born in 1959 in Kifula (Ugweno), a division of Mwanga District in the Kilimanjaro Region of Tanzania. She earned her BSc in botany and statistics from the University of Dar es Salaam. She received an MSc in fisheries and aquaculture from the University of Kuopio in Finland. Based on a course in phycology (the study of algae and seaweed), she developed an interest in seaweed farming. She earned her PhD in seaweed-integrated aquaculture from Tel Aviv University in 2004. Her thesis, "The Influence of Culture Regimes on the Performance of Seaweed Biofilters in Integrated Mariculture", examined the use of seaweed as biofilters for fishpond effluent water.

== Career ==
From 1993 to 1996, Msuya researched the socioeconomic and environmental impacts of seaweed farming. She pioneered the start of seaweed farming in southern Tanzania in 1995 and 1996. From 2005 she has been researching technologies to add value to seaweed (e.g. for making tubular nets).

Since 2017 Msuya has been part of a team implementing the GlobalSeaweedSTAR project to safeguard the future of seaweed aquaculture against the effects of climate change in countries such as Tanzania, Philippines and Malaysia. A project led by the Scottish Association of Marine Science (SAMS) and funded by the UK Research and Innovation Global Challenges Research Fund.

Msuya has worked as a research officer at the Tanzania Fisheries Research Institute (TAFIRI) in Kigoma, Tanzania. She is a former Chief Laboratory Scientist and Senior Researcher in Marine Biology at the Institute of Marine Sciences of the University of Dar es Salaam based in Zanzibar. The need for the Tanzanian industry to develop resilience towards environmental impacts has been a key focus area for her.

Msuya is one of five international trainers in Innovation and Cluster Facilitation. She trains on seaweed farming technologies, value addition and integrating seaweed with other marine products such as sea cucumbers, shellfish and finfish.

Msuya has worked with FAO, WIEGO, UNIDO and WWF. She has contributed to the start of seaweed farming in Mauritius, Rodrigues and Mayotte.

She is a member of the Tropical Agriculture Association (TAA), the Royal Society of Biology (RSB), the World Aquaculture Society (WAS), the International Seaweed Association (ISA), Western Indian Ocean Marine Science Association (WIOMSA) and the Pan African Competitiveness Forum (PACF).

Msuya is the founder and chairperson of the Zanzibar Seaweed Cluster Initiative (ZaSCI). As part of this initiative, she has contributed to producing seaweed products including powder, cosmetics and foods. ZaSCI is also assisting Zanzibar to scale-up seaweed processing through implementing seaweed processing plants for semi-refined carrageenan (the gel that determines the quality of the red seaweeds farmed in the island).

== Selected publications ==
- Msuya, Flower E.; Neori, Amir (December 2008). "Effect of water aeration and nutrient load level on biomass yield, N uptake and protein content of the seaweed Ulva lactuca cultured in seawater tanks". Journal of Applied Phycology. 20 (6): 1021–1031. doi:10.1007/s10811-007-9300-6. S2CID 20524645.
- Neori, Amir; Msuya, Flower E.; Shauli, Lilach; Schuenhoff, Andreas; Kopel, Fidi; Shpigel, Muki (November 2003). "A novel three-stage seaweed ( Ulva lactuca ) biofilter design for integrated mariculture". Journal of Applied Phycology. 15 (6): 543–553. doi:10.1023/B:JAPH.0000004382.89142.2d. S2CID 22870531.
- Schuenhoff, Andreas; Shpigel, Muki; Lupatsch, Ingrid; Ashkenazi, Arik; Msuya, Flower E; Neori, Amir (May 2003). "A semi-recirculating, integrated system for the culture of fish and seaweed". Aquaculture. 221 (1–4): 167–181. doi:10.1016/S0044-8486(02)00527-6.
- Msuya, Flower (2011). The influence of culture regimes on the performance of seaweed biofilters in integrated mariculture. Lap Lambert Academic Publishing GmbH KG. ISBN 978-3-8454-3642-5.

== See also ==
- Integrated multi-trophic aquaculture
