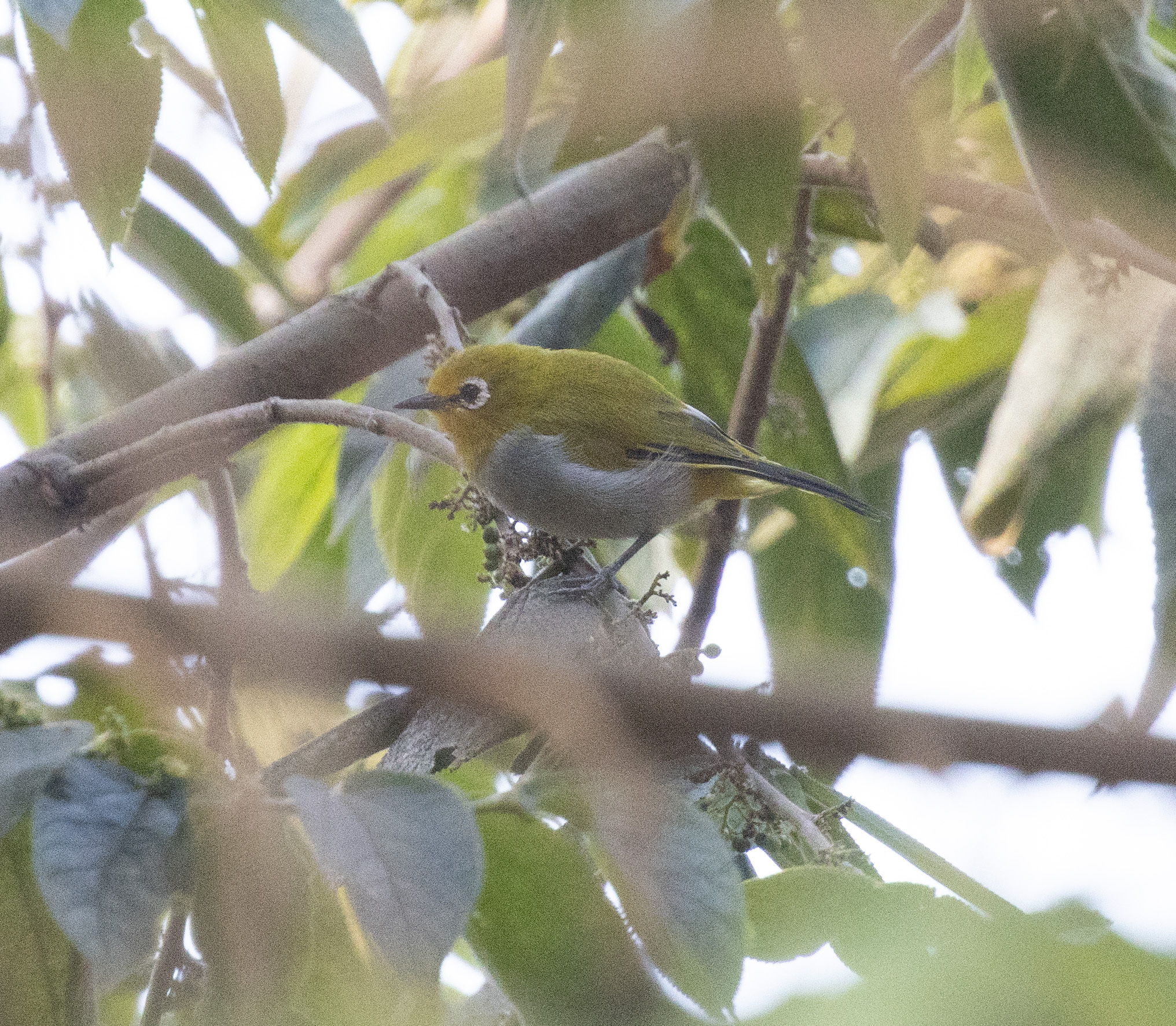

Conservation status
- Near Threatened (IUCN 3.1)

Scientific classification
- Kingdom: Animalia
- Phylum: Chordata
- Class: Aves
- Order: Passeriformes
- Family: Zosteropidae
- Genus: Zosterops
- Species: Z. winifredae

Binomial name
- Zosterops winifredae Moreau & Sclater, W.L., 1934

= South Pare white-eye =

Species of bird

The south Pare white-eye (Zosterops winifredae) is a bird species in the family Zosteropidae. Its range is restricted to the southern region of the Pare Mountains in northeastern Tanzania.

The south Pare white-eye was formerly treated as a subspecies of the Heuglin's white-eye (Zosterops poliogastrus) (previously named montane white-eye) but it is now considered as a separate species based on the phylogenetic relationships determined in a molecular study published in 2014.
