= Lumi River (East Africa) =

River in Rombo District, Kilimanjaro Region, Tanzania

Coordinates: 3°32′44″S 37°45′17″E

Lumi

Location
- Country: Tanzania
- Country: Kenya

Physical characteristics
- Source
  - location: Rombo District, Kilimanjaro
- Mouth
  - location: Lake Jipe
  - elevation: 707 m (2,320 ft)
- Basin size: 451 km^{2} (174 sq mi)

Basin features
- River system: Pangani River

The River Lumi (also Lomi or Luffu) is located in Rombo District, Kilimanjaro in northereast Tanzania and a small part in southern Kenya in Coast Province. It originates on the east side of Mawenzi peak on the east side of (Mount Kilimanjaro), and flows so close to the River Rombo as almost to form a fork. The Lumi, however, maintains its southerly direction, and may thus be said to represent the upper course of the Ruvu, one of tho two main sources of the Pangani River. It flows around the Lake Chala and the Taveta town in the west and empties into the Lake Jipe. The fish species Barbus sp. 'Pangani' has only been found in the river's N'joro Springs, situated in the upper Pangani River drainage basin.

== Wetland management ==
Most water taken from the Lumi is from the section that flows through Kenya. After the building of several dams along the Kenyan side of the Lumi, and with several periods of reduced rainfall, the dry up of Lake Jipe became a concern, necessitating wetland management programs. During the period of 2004–2006, the United Nations Development Programme GEF Small Grants Programme and the Biodiversity Conservation Programme of the European Union have completed a de-siltation and restoration project of the river's original course.
