= Pare language =

Northeast Coast Bantu language of Tanzania

Pare
- Kipare, Casu
- Native to: Tanzania
- Native speakers: (500,000 cited 2000)
- Language family: Niger–Congo?: Atlantic–Congo; Volta-Congo; Benue–Congo; Bantoid; Southern Bantoid; Bantu; Northeast Bantu; Northeast Coast Bantu; Pare-Taveta; Pareic; Pare

Language codes
- ISO 639-3: asa
- Glottolog: asut1235
- Guthrie code: G.22

Pare (Kipare), also known as Asu (Casu, Chasu, Athu, Chathu), is a Northeast Coast Bantu language spoken by the Pare people of Tanzania.

== Phonology ==
Consonants
	Labial	Dental	Alveolar	Palatal	Velar
Plosive	p b		t d	tɕ dʑ	k g
Prenasalized	ᵐp ᵐb		ⁿt ⁿd ⁿz	ⁿdʑ	ᵑk ᵑg
Fricative	f v	(θ) (ð)	s z	ɕ	x ɣ
Nasal	m		n		ŋ
Approximant	w		r, l	j	

- The dental fricatives /θ ð/ are only found in Swahili loanwords.
- /m/ can be syllabic.

Vowels
	Front	Central	Back
High	i		u
Mid	e		o
Low		a	

Additionally, Pare distinguishes between high tone and low tone.
