= Mkomazi National Park =

National Park in Tanzania

- Hifadhi ya Taifa ya Mkomazi
- IUCN category II (national park)
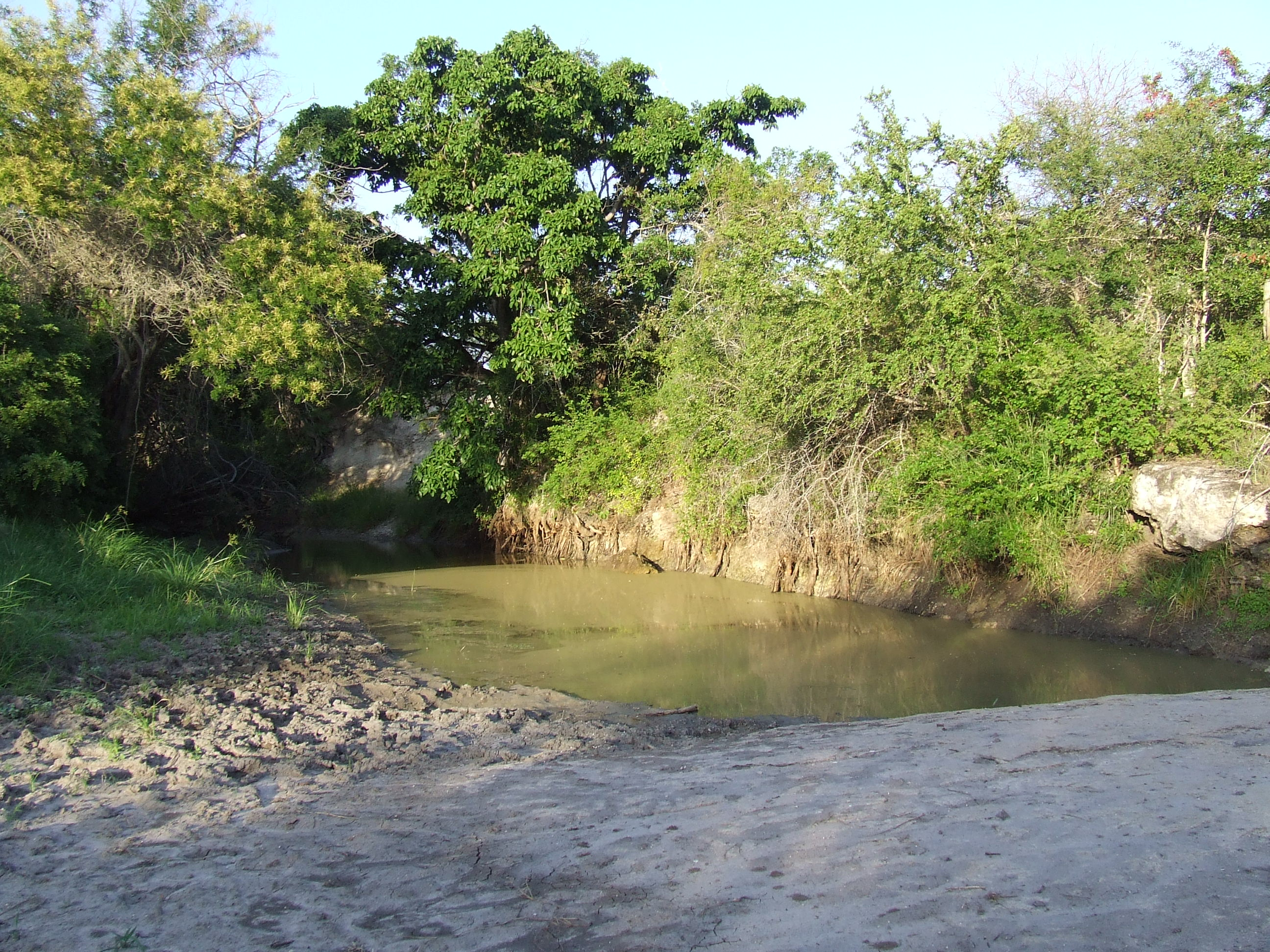

- Location within Tanzania
- Coordinates: 4°17′58″S 38°23′22″E
- Area: 3,234 km^{2} (1,249 sq mi)
- Established: 2006
- Visitors: 1,587 (in 2012)
- Governing body: Tanzania National Parks Authority
- Website: tanzaniaparks.com/mkomazi.html

Mkomazi National Park is a national park in Tanzania, located in Same District of Kilimanjaro Region and Lushoto District, with a sliver of the park in Mkinga District both of Tanga Region. It was established as a game reserve in 1951 and upgraded to a national park in 2006.

Mkomazi National Park covers over 3,234 km^{2} (1,249 sq mi) and is dominated by Acacia-Commiphora vegetation; it is contiguous with Kenya's Tsavo West National Park. The area commonly called 'Mkomazi' is actually the union of two previous game reserves, the Umba Game Reserve in the east (in Lushoto District, Tanga Region) and the Mkomazi Game Reserve in the west (in Same District, Kilimanjaro Region); in government documents they are sometimes called the Mkomazi-Umba Game Reserves. Of the two, Mkomazi is larger, and has more diversity of relief and habitat, and a longer shared border with Tsavo West National Park. In the rest of this entry, 'Mkomazi' will refer to both the Mkomazi and Umba reserves together.

== History of contest ==
Like many national parks and game reserves, Mkomazi's history is one of contest, with the main contenders being government conservation planners and local rural resources users. It differs from many other cases in East Africa because limited resource use within the reserve was initially permitted. When Mkomazi was first established a number of pastoral families from the Parakuyo ethnic group were allowed to continue to live there with a few thousand of their cattle, goats and sheep. The (colonial) government of the time permitted them to reside there because they had been in the area for many years and were thought not to threaten the ecological integrity of the reserve. The pastoralists were only allowed in the eastern half of the reserve. Immigrant Maasai pastoralists and families from other ethnic groups were evicted when the reserve was established.

However Mkomazi was soon subject to immigration by other herders, some of which was resisted by the Parakuyo residents, and some which was facilitated by them. What with resident stock breeding and immigrant stock joining the reserve, the first decades of Mkomazi's history were dominated by rising cattle populations. Some 20,000 animals were counted in the eastern half of the reserve in the early 1960s. In the early 1970s pastoralists began living and grazing in the western half of the reserve and by the mid-1980s around 80,000 cattle were counted inside the reserve as a whole. There were probably thousands more using it intermittently. Many of the immigrants were Maasai, who are very closely related to the Parakuyo, speaking the same language and sharing many customs. But local herders from other ethnic groups, such as the Sambaa and Pare, also grazed thousands of cattle inside Mkomazi.

The volume of cattle within the reserve caused considerable concern for the environment and there was continual pressure to have them evicted. In the late 1980s the government resolved to cease all grazing permission within Mkomazi and evicted all herders. By July 1988 these evictions were complete. Evicted Maasai and Parakuyo pastoralists contested the legality of the evictions, claiming customary rights to the reserve in the Tanzanian courts, but lost their case. After the evictions the British charity, the George Adamson Wildlife Preservation Trust and its American sister charity, the Tony Fitzjohn, George Adamson African Wildlife Preservation Trust became interested in Mkomazi, and have since been spearheading a campaign to restore the reserve. They have set up fenced sanctuaries for African wild dog and black rhinoceros, and are restoring the reserve's infrastructure and supporting local communities with its outreach program.

=== Representations ===
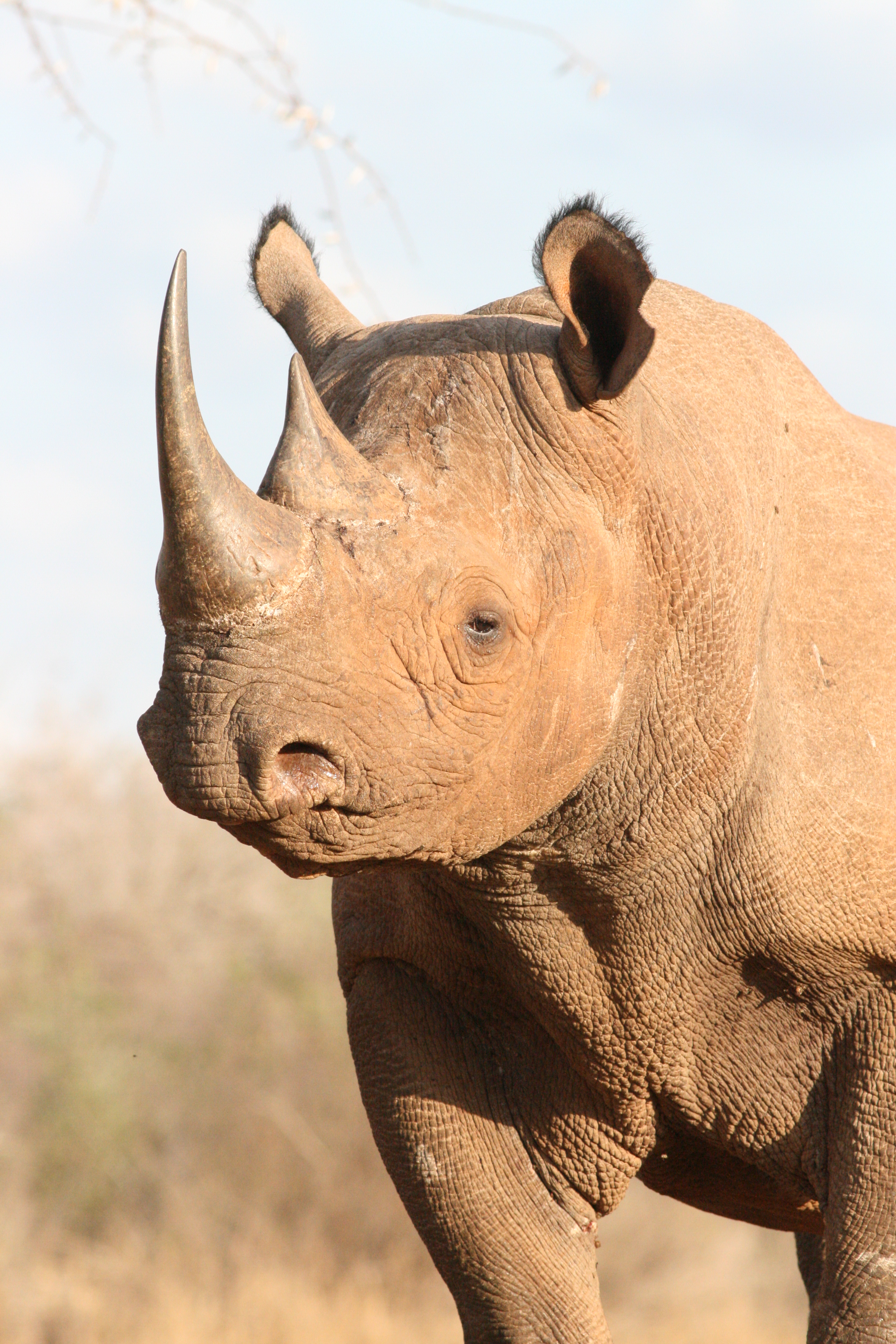
Rhinoceros, Mkomazi National Park, Tanzania

The reserve is still subject to illegal incursions from pastoralists, particularly in the wet season. But the main contests about Mkomazi today concern its representation (as comments on this entry may shortly demonstrate). Generally speaking there are two broad camps:

For many conservationists, Mkomazi is a success story. A reserve which was threatened by people and grazing has been restored to good health. The compounds for African wild dog, and the extensive, patrolled sanctuary for the black rhinoceros (which are breeding) have given the reserve international recognition. Roads have been regraded, dams dredged, and rangers kitted out with uniforms and radios. Anti-poaching patrols restrict incursions by hunters and pastoralists. The work with schools and support for other local needs strengthens relationships with local communities. A tourist safari company has recently announced plans to set up regular holiday safaris to Mkomazi, which will generate more revenue from it and for it.

Few of Mkomazi's critics can dispute the facts of the previous paragraph, but for them it is simply not the whole story. They resent pro-conservation literature which failed to mention or passed over the evictions and denied former residents' long association with the land. They know the reserve as a place from which thousands of herders were evicted, with inadequate compensation for a few and for most none. They feel that outreach programmes' benefits do not match the costs of eviction, that many evictees do not benefit from them, and that the numbers of people around the reserve (over 50,000) make it hard to provide meaningful benefits for most locals. They believe the ecological case for eviction is weak - it was often made without any supporting data. Critics of Mkomazi see another sad case of conservation separating people from land. This is not the restoration of wilderness, for none had in fact existed, rather its pristineness has been created and imposed.

Despite their stark differences, the two versions of the reserve flourish independently in separate habitats and rarely collide. The positive aspects of Mkomazi's conservation is repeatedly championed in diverse campaigns and fund-raisers, winning international support, awards and celebrity endorsement. It raises hundreds of thousands of dollars a year. Critical perspectives thrive in university courses' teaching material, anthropological and human rights circles, and among conservationists who advocate inclusive approaches to conservation. Here Mkomazi is becoming a benchmark case of how not to evict local people. It is one of the few protected areas for which the costs of eviction and the impoverishment resulting from conservation policies has been rigorously documented.

Compromise positions have been offered. Some observers argued that there is the ecological space to allow for a compromise which includes grazing inside Mkomazi. This is legally possible in Tanzania inside game reserves theoretically, but it would only have been realistic in the east as pastoral immigration was often unpopular in the western half. However since Mkomazi has been upgraded to full national park status, which precludes all local use, this is no longer an option. Mkomazi seems destined to be a place about which two very different stories will always be told.

== Fauna ==
- African wild dog
- Black rhinoceros
- Lion
- Common eland
- Hartebeest
- Grant's Zebra
- African Elephant
- Spotted hyena

A study by the UK's Royal Geographical Society reported a wide diversity of fauna and catalogued many interactions among the species.

== See also ==
- Amani Nature Reserve
- Usambara Mountains
