= Pare Mountains =

Mountain range in Kilimanjaro Region of Tanzania

- Milima ya Upare (Swahili)
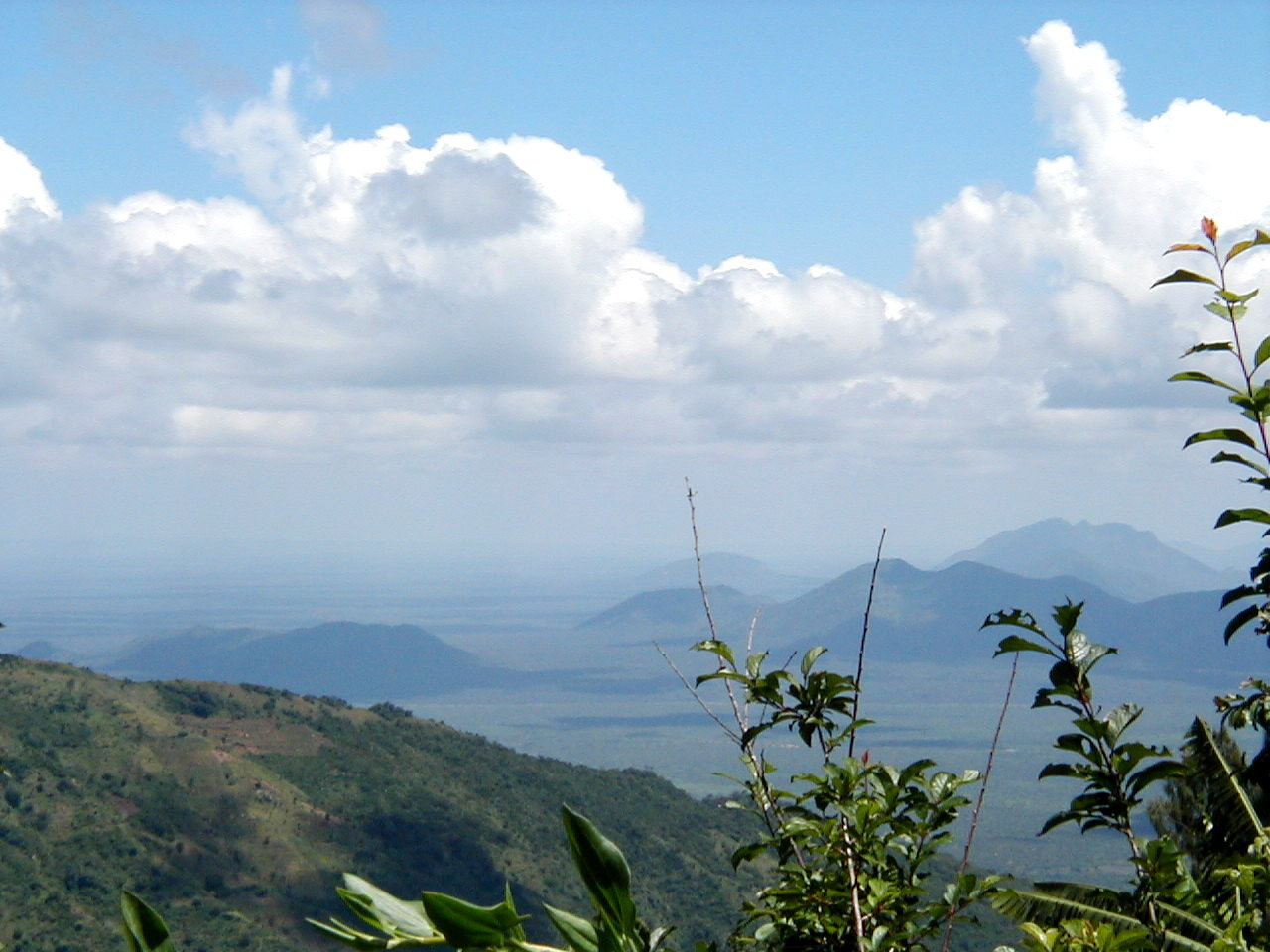
- North Pare Mountains, view to the east from the village of Kilomeni

Highest point
- Peak: Shengena Peak
- Elevation: 2,464 m (8,084 ft)
- Prominence: 1,746 m (5,728 ft)
- Listing: Ultra; Ribu
- Coordinates: 4°16′4.08″S 37°55′53.4″E

Geography
- Country: Tanzania
- Region: Kilimanjaro Region
- District(s): Mwanga District & Same District

The Pare Mountains (Swahili: Milima ya Upare) is a mountain range in northeastern Tanzania, located north of the Usambara Mountains. The mountains are administratively located in the Kilimanjaro Region, specifically in the Mwanga District and Same District. The North and South Pare mountain ranges reach a height of 2,464 meters at Shengena Peak. They are separated into North Pare Mountains and South Pare Mountains and are part of the Eastern Arc of mountains. The mountains are named after the indigenous Pare people who reside there.

Bird species in the Pare mountains include the endemic South Pare white-eye (Zosterops winifredae), the mountain buzzard (Buteo oreophilus), olive woodpecker (Mesopicos griseocephalus), moustached tinkerbird (Pogoniulus leucomystax), and the African hill babbler (Pseudoalcippe abyssinica).
