= Hehe Chiefdom =

- 1860–1961
- Capital: Kalenga
- Government: Monarchy
- Chief
  - 1855/60–1879: Munyigumba
  - 1880-1894: Chief Mkwawa
- History
  - Established: 1860
  - Conquest by Germans: 1894
  - Abolition of the traditional chiefdom: 1961

Population
  - Estimate: 60-70,000
Succeeded by
German East Africa
- Today part of: Tanzania

Hehe Chiefdom was a traditional state of the Hehe people that existed as an independent state until 1894.

== History ==
=== Unification ===
Chief Munyigumba began unification of the Hehe tribes around 1860. He subjugated clans such as Myovela of Udongwe, Muhingile of Milanzi and Mugabe of Bkalinga. He spread his influence through Hole, Hula, Image and into the Lukosi valley over the Wasagara between the escarpment and the Great Ruaha. Later he campaigned against the Wakinamanga, defeating them at the battle of Mugoda Mutitu around 1867 and expelling them from the county of Ngololo.

In 1875 Munyigumba attacked the Sangu and dethroned its chief, Merere. Merere later returned and was attacked again by the hehe in October and November 1877 which he managed to repel. In 1878 the Ngoni tribe's attack on Hehes was repelled. In 1878 or 1879 Angoni attack besieged Munyigumba which was relieved by Munyigumba with thelp of his son Mkwawa. In 1879 chief Munyigumba died resulting in a dispute between his first-born son Mkwawa and administrator Mwamubambe. After being expelled and having to flee to the territory of neighboring tribe, Mkawa was able to rally the tribes around him and defeat Mwamubambe at the battle of Usawila in 1880. The same year he managed to take control of the northern part of Hehe chiefdom ruled by Muhenga. He established his headquarters at Kalenga, near the modern town of Iringa. In 1881 Hehe forces again fought against the Ngoni tribe, resulting in a peace treaty between the two groups that divided the territory of Bena tribe between them.

In 1883 Mkawa defeated Mwamubambe forces again at the battle of Luvaha during which the defeated general died. By February of the year a Hehe communisty was established in the Wota mountains. In 1884 he launched an expedition against the Useke (present Manyoni district), followed by Mpembe and Loato in 1885. In 1886 he attacked Chief Merere capturing two of his daughters as well as attacking Nyambwa in Ugogo. In 1887 Hehe forces attacked the Wasagara and Vidunda, followed by Wasangu in 1888 and 1889 and Konde in 1889.

=== Hehe wars ===
The Wahehe were expanding towards the north and east at the same time the Germans were building stations along the central caravan route between the coast and Tabora. Those groups recognizing and accepting German supremacy (showing the German flag) were then brutally attacked, looted, and otherwise destroyed. After futile German attempts to negotiate with them, an expedition was sent out under the leadership of commander Emil von Zelewski.

The civilian governor, Julius von Soden, was not enthusiastic about the plan, but acquiesced. Zelewski left Kilwa in July 1891 with four companies, but when he reached the Rufiji River he sent the company under the command of Lieutenant Tom Prince back to Dar es Salaam, telling Prince that three companies would be sufficient to deal with the Hehe, because "these fellows do not even have rifles, only shields and spears." Zelewski led his troops onwards, with little resistance, across the Great Ruaha River and into the highlands of Uhehe. On 17 August 1891 the Germans were ambushed at Lugalo by a force of several thousand Hehe, commanded by Mkwawa's brother, Mpangile. Only three of the thirteen Europeans survived, and around eighty percent of their African troops were killed. Zelewski was among the fallen. The Hehe also lost many men, and the surviving Germans retreated back towards the caravan route.

Lieutenant Maximilian von Tettenborn, who had been in command of the rearguard, was the senior surviving officer. On 30 August he wrote Governor von Soden a letter from Miyombo, just south of modern Kilosa. He reported the attack in the following terms:

The column and the artillery had just reached this thicket when a signal shot was heard. Immediately the Hehe appeared on either side of the column in large numbers, not more than thirty paces away. With wild cries they advanced upon us in a frenzy. Our soldiers were able to fire only once or twice before the enemy were among them. The confusion was increased by the headlong flight of the donkeys transporting the artillery. The animals charged into the 5th Company. We could not restrain our men from fleeing, and the enemy pursued them vigorously.

The severe defeat at Lugalo was a great setback to German military prestige, and significantly depleted the colony's military forces, but Governor Soden resisted the urge for revenge. In a letter to the German chancellor dated 17 November 1892 he wrote, "We should at least have digested the coast before we devoured the interior." Military expeditions into Uhehe were prohibited, but Lieutenant Tom Prince was sent to establish a station to protect the trading town of Kondoa. He erected his fort a little west of the town early in November 1891 and called it Kilosa. In May 1892 he established another station at Kisaki. From these strongpoints he began raiding into territory which Mkwawa had conquered on both sides of the Great Ruaha River. Mkwawa was not intimidated, and his forces destroyed a German detachment near Kilosa on 6 October 1892.

Governor Soden left the colony early in 1893. His successor was Friedrich von Schele, a military officer of aggressive instincts but limited ability. The Germans built alliances with the Bena and Sangu peoples whose lands adjoined Uhehe, and Governor Schele led a large expedition which approached Uhehe from the south, reaching Mkwawa's strongly fortified position at Kalenga (west of modern Iringa) late in October 1894. Fortunately for Schele, he was accompanied by Tom Prince, who led the attack on Kalenga on 30 October. The fortress was stormed, but Mkwawa and most of his warriors were able to escape. Schele made no attempt to establish a permanent presence in Uhehe and returned to the coast, largely negating the purpose of the expedition.

There was then an uneasy peace between Mkwawa and the Germans, although Prince continued to conduct operations on the northern fringes of Uhehe. Prince was on leave in Germany from the end of 1895 until his return to Dar es Salaam in May 1896. He had been promoted to captain, and with his new bride, the former Magdalene von Massow, he set out to establish a new station at Perondo, in the southeast foothills of the Uhehe plateau.

In August 1896 Prince advanced into Uhehe. He encountered some resistance, but Mkwawa retreated, unwilling to meet the Germans in a pitched battle. In September Prince established a new station at Iringa, about twelve kilometres east of Mkwawa's destroyed fortress at Kalenga. To permanently weaken the Hehe kingdom, Prince divided it into two parts. In the western half, the Sangu chief, Merere, was installed as ruler on 10 December 1896. In the eastern half, Mkwawa's brother, Mpangile, was installed as ruler on 24 December. Although Mkwawa was still at large, Prince deceived himself that the Hehe were now largely pacified.

The situation soon deteriorated. Mpangile was secretly in contact with Mkwawa, and when Prince discovered this, he had Mpangile executed on 22 February 1897. A local missionary described the execution: "The mood of the people was not pleasant. From the scaffold, Mpangile urged the Hehe to join Mkwawa in waging war on the Europeans. Henceforth they should employ deceit to murder their opponents." The Hehe took Mpangile at his word, and Uhehe was soon in rebellion. Mkwawa conducted a very effective guerrilla operation, making use of the rugged terrain to avoid pitched battles with the large German force arrayed against him.

Eduard von Liebert, who had recently taken up the post of governor, was a military man with no experience of African warfare. In July and August 1897 he personally led an expedition to Uhehe, which proved inconclusive. As Liebert later conceded,

I have had practical experience of warfare in Bohemia and France, and for thirty years I have never ceased to occupy myself with military science, and especially with military history, but what I encountered here in Uhehe was beyond anything which has yet been seen … I had originally imagined that I would make my journey into the interior of the colony with just a horsewhip in my hand, and that I would travel through most places largely without violence.

To destroy support for Mkwawa, the Germans instituted a scorched-earth policy in Uhehe, reducing much of the population to starvation. Early in January 1898 Prince was able to report on the capture of Mkwawa's camp in the Udzungwa Mountains. He noted that "Many of these people were just skin and bones. In this whole camp of 1,000 souls we did not find a single bag of corn. Even in Mkwawa's hut there were only sweet potatoes." Mkwawa was increasingly isolated, and hotly pursued. He killed himself and his last companion on 19 July 1898, not far north of Kalenga. Sergeant-Major Hans Merkl cut off Mkwawa's head and took it back to the station at Iringa. Magdalene Prince recorded that

Tom took a photograph of Mkwawa's head. No European can claim to have seen Mkwawa's face before, and even in death this most powerful and energetic of all native princes would not allow his mortal enemies to see his real face, because he shot himself in the head and his features had thus been deformed. Nonetheless the characteristic features of the head could still be seen: the small face with unusual slit-like eyes which were however comparatively large, the strong nose, the thick lips, of which the lower hung noticeably downwards, almost as far as the strongly protruding, energetic chin. This chin, the thick lips, and the thrusting jaws gave the head a distinct air of cruelty and willpower.

== List of rulers ==
Vayinga tribe:

- Mwamuyinga I (c. 1700)
- Mwamuyinga II (c. 1730)
- Kitowa I (1745-?)
- Kitowa II (?-1790)
- Mdegela (1790-1820)
- Kilonge (1820-c. 1855/1860)

Unified chiefdom:

- Munyigumba (c.1855/1860-1879)
- Mwambambe (1879-1880)
- Chief Mkwawa (1880-1894)

Colonial indirect rule:

- Sapi (1926-1940)
- Adam (1940-1961)
