= Sangu people =

Ethnic group from Mbeya Region of Tanzania

Sangu
Total population
- In 1987 the Sangu population was estimated to number 75,000

Regions with significant populations
- Tanzania

Languages
- Sangu

Religion
- Christian, African Traditional Religion

Related ethnic groups
- Nguni

The Sangu people (or Rori) are an ethnic group based in the Usangu Plain of Chunya District of Mbeya Region, Tanzania.They speak Sangu (or Kisangu), which belongs to the Bantu language family. The Sangu community has a rich cultural heritage and is known for traditional practices, music, and art. Society is organized around clans and relies on both farming and livestock, such as cattle. Sangu people are also recognized for their historical role in local conflicts and alliances during the colonial era in East Africa.

By 1907, their numbers were thought to be about 30,000. By 1987, their population had risen to an estimated 75,000.

Before the arrival of the Ngoni ethic group, the coastal regions, the Southern Highlands had no political unit larger than clans and chiefdoms. The Sangu clans were thought to have organized into a military force in the 1830's after being attacked. The Sangu sent slaves and ivory to representatives of the coastal regions and were the first to adopt the weapons, tactics, and followed the organization of the Ngoni who dominated the highlands until civil war broke out .

== Hehe wars ==
Other African groups, including the Hehe (the second to imitate the Ngoni), they took Sangu regimental names and language forms.

The father of Chief Mkwawa of the Muyinga family of the Hehe people began to form a unified state to be called Uhehe. The Hehe people attacked the Sangu in 1857 and forced them to abandon their capital Utengule at least three times. The Sangu repeatedly attempted to return to Utengule but failed. They retreated westwards to build a new Utengule near present-day Mbeya. This location which was to become one of East Africa's most elaborate Bomas (a massive stone fortress, supposedly the largest in East Africa, later deliberately destroyed by the Germans). The Hehe, recovering from their own civil war in 1879, continued their aggressive expansion and showed themselves to be more than a match for Merere II, the Sangu leader, despite the fact that the Sangu had reportedly begun using guns as early as 1893, had great experience in war and were noted for 'throwing their dead away' mostly into ravines. All Sangu chiefs carried the title of Merere, whose personal name was Mwahavange, the title-holder.

Sangu, Bena and Kinga are part of the Niger-Congo-Bantu people who lived in Iringa province before ivory and slave hunters Ngazija (Shia Iranian) from Comoro came. The Ngazija Iranian people are part of the family of Mnyigumba Muyinga, the father of Chief Mkwawa. Their hunters used Hamitic People from Ethiopia as their guide to hunt and kill elephants and the Bantu people were used to carry ivory to the ocean by Zanzibar. Now referred to as Sangu, many ran away and hid in areas such as Usangu Basin to avoid being enslaved. Others went to the Ukinga Maountan, and are now known as the Kinga Peoples. The people who hid in the Bena Caves now are known as Wabena Manga, and those who went to Pangwa Mountain are called the Wapangwa people, etc. Mnyigumba forced the Bantu people (now Hehe) to adopt their culture and religion. The scarves and turbans they wear are similar to Iranian dress.

== German involvement ==
Merere II, having lost his homeland to the Hehe, wrote to the German Governor Julius von Soden in January 1892: "I ask you to come quickly. I will show you the way...and stand by you in the war....The Hehe are gathering their men to defeat me. I beg not to leave me alone this year." German officers were ordered to help enemies of the Wahehe and encircle Mkwawa. Lieutenant Tom von Prince, in early 1893, with Bauer and Wynecken, was able to offer the help requested by Merere II, promising to restore Merere to his homeland if he guarded Uhehe's western border against Mkwawa.

Mkwawa was defeated in his capital, Iringa in 1896 and declared an 'outlaw'. He was reduced to waging guerrilla war, and finally fled south and died years later (Mkwawa did not commit suicide as many scholars report. Elders from the tribe provided evidence that his death was faked by Germans to glorify their years of loss and a skull sent to Germany was not Mkwawa's.)

It took until December 10, 1896, to re-install Merere III of Usangu, back in his capital of Utengule, which his father had lost 22 years earlier to the Wahehe. Merere II died in 1893, having been declared by his people as being mentally incompetent and His son becoming successor but was never considered truly sovereign. By 1907 the Wasangu numbers were thought to be about 30,000.
