= Old Tanga Secondary School =

Coordinates: 5.066667°S 39.1°E

Old Tanga Secondary School is a school in Tanga, Tanzania. It was built by the German colonial authorities in the 1890s as the first formal government school in Tanganyika - the mainland part of present-day Tanzania.

The Tanga Heritage Centre restored the main building of this school with funds solicitated from the German Government.
