= Tanga Heritage Centre =

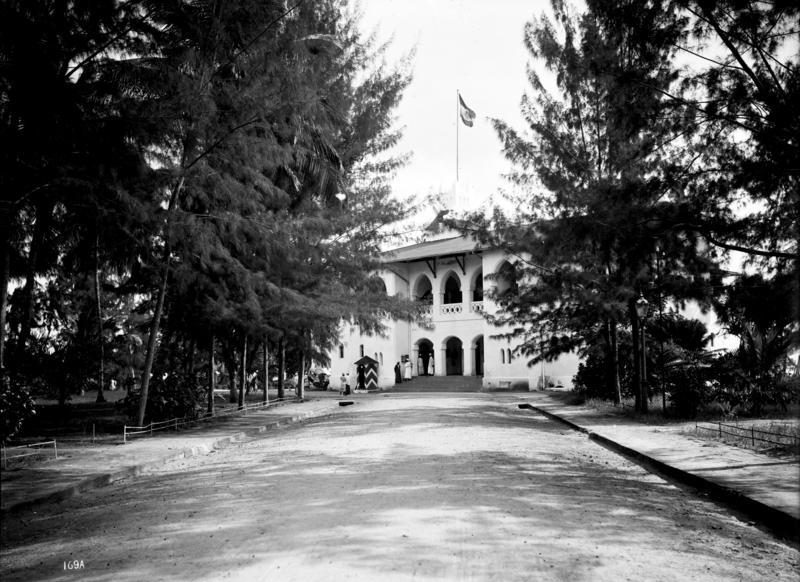
Tanga Museum

The Tanga Heritage Centre, popularly known as Urithi (Swahili for Heritage) is a not-for-profit Non-governmental organization based in Tanga, Tanzania. It was founded in 1999 with the mission to preserve and promote the city's heritage. Its area of work also covers the surrounding Tanga Region.

It has so far restored the Usambara Court House, the Old Tanga Secondary School, the German graveyard and the Tanga clock tower.
