= Hehe people =

Ethnic group in Tanzania

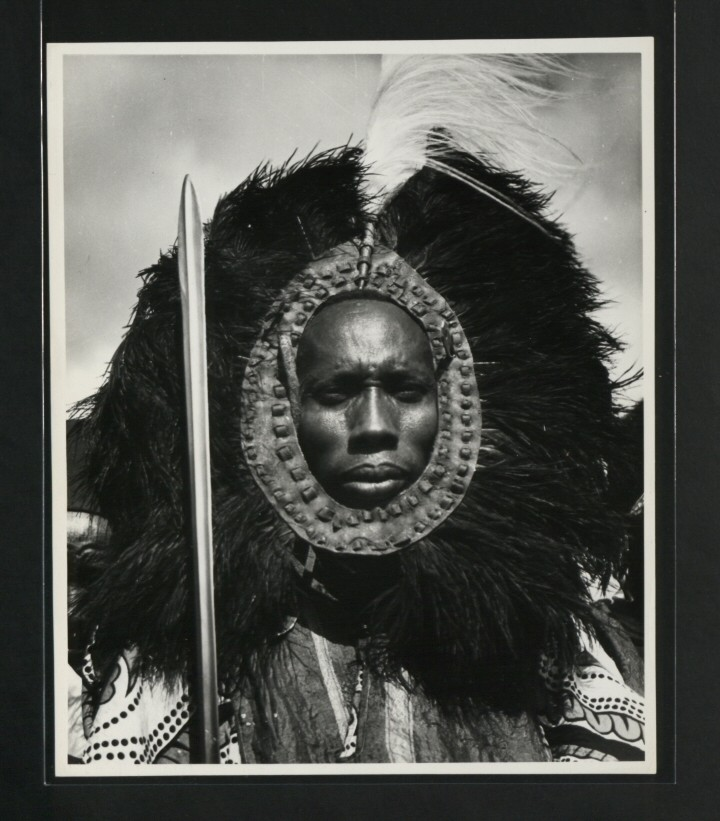
A Hehe warrior in traditional attire

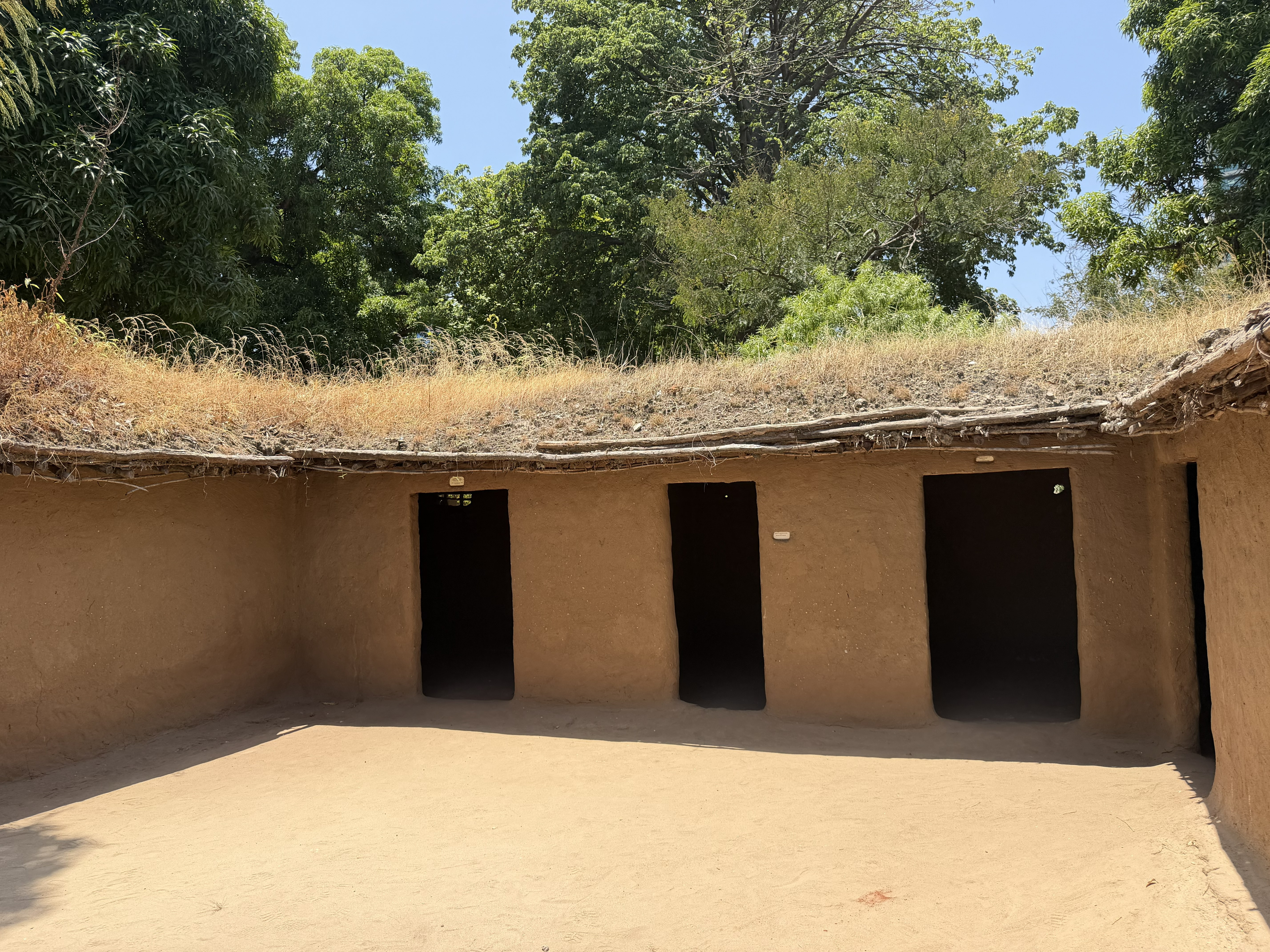
Outside look of traditional Hehe House

The Hehe is a Bantu ethnolinguistic group based in Iringa Region in south-central Tanzania, speaking the Bantu Hehe language. In 2006, the Hehe population was estimated at 805,000, up from the just over 250,000 recorded in the 1957 census, when they were the eighth largest ethnic group in Tanganyika. There were an additional 4,023 of them in Uganda in 2014.

Historically, they are famous for vanquishing a German colonial expedition at Lugalo on 17 August 1891 and maintaining their resistance for seven years thereafter under the leadership of their chief Mkwawa.

== Etymology ==
The use of Wahehe as the group's designator can be traced to their war cry, and was originally employed by their adversaries. The Wahehe themselves adopted it only after the Germans and British applied it consistently, but by then the term had acquired connotations of prestige.

== History ==
It appeared from the Report of the East Africa Commission that, from the point of view of research, the British record in Tanganyika might be exposed to criticism by an international Commission, insomuch as, from reasons of pressing economy following the War, it had been found necessary to suppress the research establishment previously maintained by the Germans.

— Conclusions of a Meeting of the Cabinet, 20 May 1925

"Of scientific literature on British East Africa", remarked John Walter Gregory in 1896, "there is unfortunately little to record. There is nothing which can compare with the magnificent series of works issued in description of German East Africa […] The history of the exploration of Equatorial Africa is one to which Englishmen can look back with feelings of such just pride, that we may ungrudgingly admit the superiority of German scientific work in this region." It is no surprise, therefore, that most of the important sources for the history of the Hehe are German. Once German East Africa was split between the British and Belgian empires after World War I, the interest of German scholars waned, and the British chose not to continue their research.

The people who were eventually called Hehe by Europeans lived in isolation on a highland in southwestern modern-day Tanzania, northeast of Lake Nyasa (Lake Malawi). They had few ancestors who had been in their region called Uhehe for more than four generations. With the exception of some pastoralists on the plains and some keeping a limited number of cattle and goats, the Wahehe were primarily an agricultural people. In the beginning they seemed to have lived in relative peace, although the various chiefs did quarrel with one another, raided each other for cattle and broke alliances. The population was probably small, with no chiefdom over 5,000 people. By the middle of the 19th century, however, Nguruhe, one of the more important chiefdoms led by the Muyinga dynasty, began to push its weight around and expand its influence and power.

It was Munyigumbe, of the Muyinga family, who began to create the beginnings of a 'state' by both marriage and conquest. A good deal of this was at the expense of the Wasangu, using the Sangu's own military tactics and even utilizing forms of the Sangu language to properly rouse Hehe warriors to battle. Munyigumba even forced the Wasangu, under Merere II, to move their capital to Usafwa.

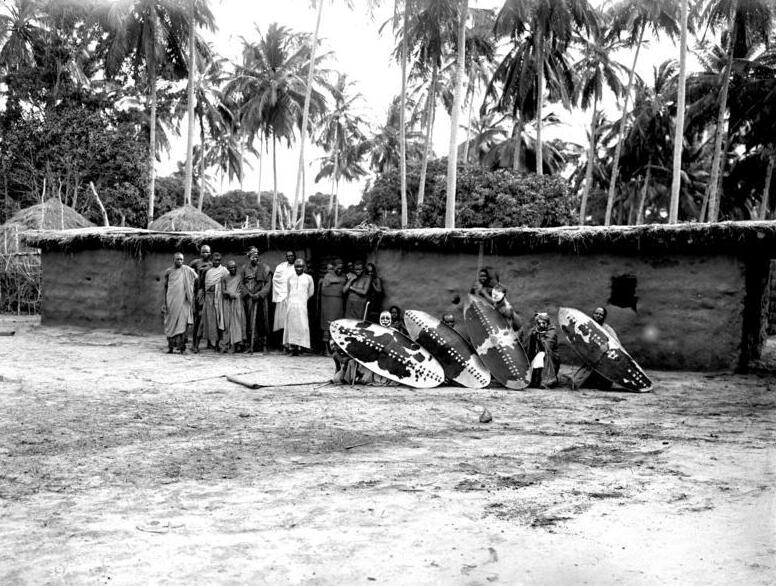
Hehe warriors from Iringa (1906)

With Munyigumba's death in 1878 or 1879, a civil war broke out and a Nyamwezi slave, married to Munyigumba's sister, was able to kill Munyigumba's brother, leaving the unhappy prospect of dealing with Munyigumba's son Mkwawa. Mkwawa killed the Nyamwezi slave, Mwumbambe, at a location called the "place where heads are piled up", and Mkwawa became the paramount leader of the Wahehe until the end of the 19th century. John Iliffe describes Mkwawa in his book A Modern History of Tanganyika as "slender, sharply intelligent, brutal, and cruel with a praise-name of the madness of the year".

It was Mkwawa who, by 1880 or 1881, became the sole ruler of Uhehe through war and intimidation. Mkwawa and his warriors continued expanding Hehe power northwards toward the central caravan routes. He fought against the Wagogo, the Wakaguru, the Germans, and others. This included their old enemies the Wasangu, who then began turning to the Germans for support. By 1890, the Hehe were the strongest and most dominant power in the southeast and began conflicting with that other raiding power, the Germans.

Sub-Chief Motomkali Mukini ″Mkini″ was assigned to rule and during his reign had established a military base used to recruit and train at the place so called Ihumitangu, meaning the place where colonial fighters were trained. He was succeeded by his son Galakwila Motomkali Mkini.^{[When and according to which source?]}

== Society ==
The Wahehe reside primarily in Uhehe, an area that:

lies between the Great Ruaha and Kilombero rivers, in the Usungwa mountains and the plateaux which lie in the northern part of the area known as the Southern Highlands. It includes areas of rainforest, high rolling grasslands, a central plateau of Brachystegia woodland and, below the escarpment in the north-east, north and west beside the Great Ruaha River and its tributaries, dry plains covered with thorn scrub.

With their armed opposition to German East Africa in mind, colonial descriptions would romanticise the Hehe as "these coarse, reserved mountain people […] a true warrior tribe who live only for war." Their power depended on the spear and on the disciplined force of their armed citizens. Even after firearms became more important, the spear remained their chief weapon, for on the open plains the use of spears still had the advantage. The defense of a boma behind palisades or walls with rifles was not their strong point, tactics and a sudden mass spear attack was.

Military organization remained the most important part of Wahehe life and every adult male was a warrior. The youngest lived in the capital, Iringa, where semi-professional warriors trained them. By the 1890s the Hehe had an immediate following of 2,000 to 3,000 men, with another 20,000 men of fighting age who could be mobilized from their scattered homesteads that by 1800 were normally surrounded by large maize fields. It was only later when their military reputation alone was no longer enough and warfare was actually a threat, did they begin to consolidate their villages and begin to build their homes closer together. Only after the wars ended did they once again build further apart with each homestead ideally surrounded by their own fields, larger houses for their many wives were built and could be surrounded by an open courtyard.

While Iliffe considers the Wahehe state to have been unsophisticated, Lt. Nigmann considered the legal system, traditions, and customs to have been quite sophisticated. It is true, however, that all authority came from the chief's will and that conquered chiefdoms were not assimilated but were held by for force, brutality, and fear. Whether one considers the state to be unsophisticated or not, the state was at the same time successful and durable. A visitor it was repeatedly said, could sense an arrogant confidence that was not found elsewhere, and Hehe identity has survived all colonial pressures.

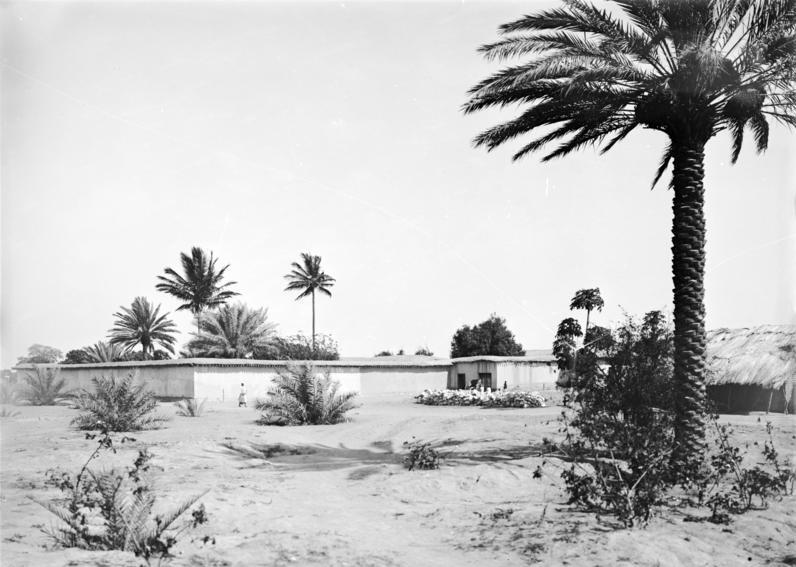
A tembe (traditional Wahehe housing) from Tabora (1906)

Women captured in war were given to important men, (some men having as many as ten to twenty) who then did almost all of the subsistence agriculture, carried water, and all building material, their housing being well insulated against the violent extremes of heat and cold. A child received his family name (the praise name), and the types of forbidden food from the father. A Wahehe could not marry anyone with the same praise name and the same forbidden food, even if the relationship could not be traced, and could not marry anyone related through the female line. There was, however, a preference for marrying cross cousins. Most communities contained many households who were related to one another. Two cows and a bull were considered important parts of bride-wealth to be given for a wife.

Although judges (headmen) were subject to bribery (and at times quite willing to accept it), there was a recognized system of courts and law enforcement. Punishment remained fairly simple but had at least some variety. There were penalties of varied types, such as fines or penance, the death sentence, beatings, and the seldom used expulsion from the chiefdom. (excepting the death penalty, crippling or anything attacking the health of the individual, or any type of failing was unknown to the Wahehe.) The village headman was authorized for lighter cases, such as theft or other crimes against property, adultery, personal injury, etc., with the more difficult cases being sent further up the line in the direction of the 'sultan', especially those needing a test administrated by poison. All cases were presented orally and open to all. (Only trials of high treason against the sultan were held in secret.) Two male witnesses were thought sufficient for most 'normal' cases while it was thought that three to five were necessary with female witnesses.

There could be verdicts for betraying or offending the state or its leader, giving false witness, adultery, (one female witness was sufficient, with a fine of one to three head of cattle) incest (very seldom if ever used, since females were quite often married between 10 and 13 years of age and needed three to five witnesses), rape (only the victim was needed as a witness), murder, manslaughter, vendetta, theft, agricultural theft, receiving stolen goods, and swindling were all parts of the judicial concept and had penalties associated with them.

If a divorce took place, the husband was entitled to take all weaned children away from their mother and the mother's family was expected to return the bride-wealth. In spite of this, wives frequently obtained divorces, usually after they had already made arrangements with another man.

The state's strength and power lay in its warriors and their spears, which made it not only disciplined and victorious, but also provided unity and identity, allowing everyone to join in its successes.

== Hehe wars ==
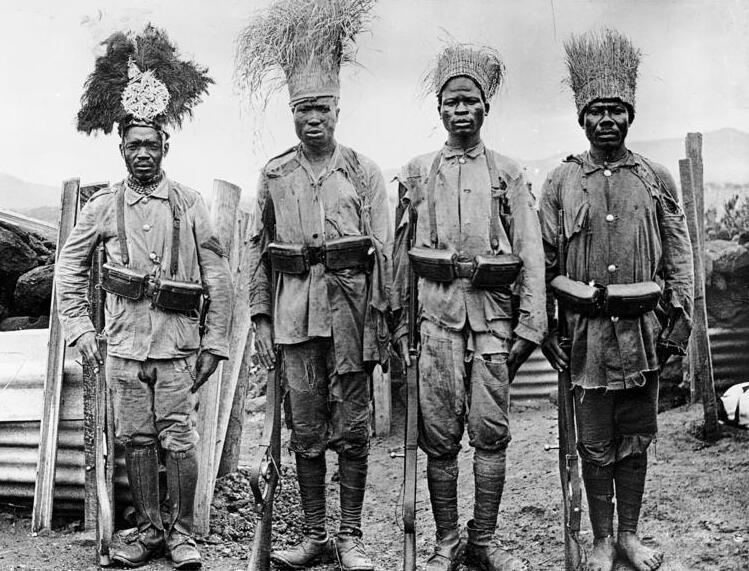
Wahehe Askari soldiers under German command (1906)

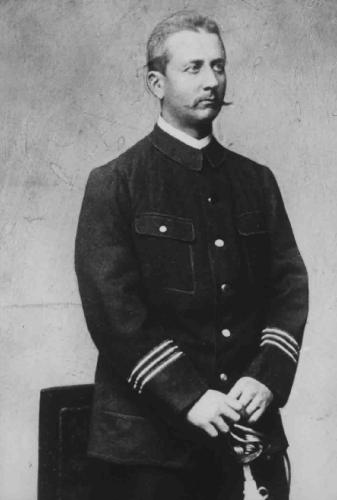
Commander Emil von Zelewski of the German Schutztruppe

The Wahehe were expanding towards the north and east at the same time the Germans were building stations along the central caravan route between the coast and Tabora. Those groups recognizing and accepting German supremacy (showing the German flag) were then brutally attacked, looted, and otherwise destroyed. After futile German attempts to negotiate with them, an expedition was sent out under the leadership of commander Emil von Zelewski.

The civilian governor, Julius von Soden, was not enthusiastic about the plan, but acquiesced. Zelewski left Kilwa in July 1891 with four companies, but when he reached the Rufiji River he sent the company under the command of Lieutenant Tom Prince back to Dar es Salaam, telling Prince that three companies would be sufficient to deal with the Hehe, because "these fellows do not even have rifles, only shields and spears." Zelewski led his troops onwards, with little resistance, across the Great Ruaha River and into the highlands of Uhehe. On 17 August 1891 the Germans were ambushed at Lugalo by a force of several thousand Hehe, commanded by Mkwawa's brother, Mpangile. Only three of the thirteen Europeans survived, and around eighty percent of their African troops were killed. Zelewski was among the fallen. The Hehe also lost many men, and the surviving Germans retreated back towards the caravan route.

Lieutenant Maximilian von Tettenborn, who had been in command of the rearguard, was the senior surviving officer. On 30 August he wrote Governor von Soden a letter from Miyombo, just south of modern Kilosa. He reported the attack in the following terms:

The column and the artillery had just reached this thicket when a signal shot was heard. Immediately the Hehe appeared on either side of the column in large numbers, not more than thirty paces away. With wild cries they advanced upon us in a frenzy. Our soldiers were able to fire only once or twice before the enemy were among them. The confusion was increased by the headlong flight of the donkeys transporting the artillery. The animals charged into the 5th Company. We could not restrain our men from fleeing, and the enemy pursued them vigorously.

The severe defeat at Lugalo was a great setback to German military prestige, and significantly depleted the colony's military forces, but Governor Soden resisted the urge for revenge. In a letter to the German chancellor dated 17 November 1892 he wrote, "We should at least have digested the coast before we devoured the interior." Military expeditions into Uhehe were prohibited, but Lieutenant Tom Prince was sent to establish a station to protect the trading town of Kondoa. He erected his fort a little west of the town early in November 1891 and called it Kilosa. In May 1892 he established another station at Kisaki. From these strongpoints he began raiding into territory which Mkwawa had conquered on both sides of the Great Ruaha River. Mkwawa was not intimidated, and his forces destroyed a German detachment near Kilosa on 6 October 1892.

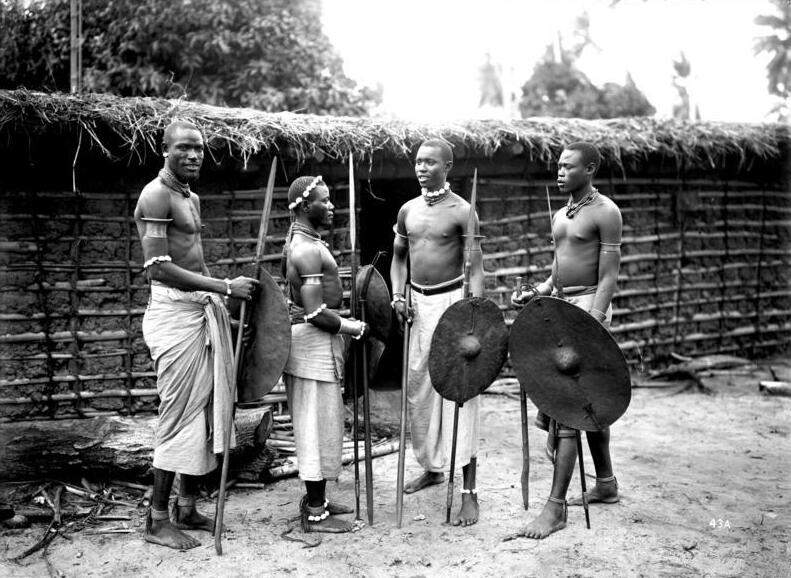
Warriors from Kondoa (1906)

Governor Soden left the colony early in 1893. His successor was Friedrich von Schele, a military officer of aggressive instincts but limited ability. The Germans built alliances with the Bena and Sangu peoples whose lands adjoined Uhehe, and Governor Schele led a large expedition which approached Uhehe from the south, reaching Mkwawa's strongly fortified position at Kalenga (west of modern Iringa) late in October 1894. Fortunately for Schele, he was accompanied by Tom Prince, who led the attack on Kalenga on 30 October. The fortress was stormed, but Mkwawa and most of his warriors were able to escape. Schele made no attempt to establish a permanent presence in Uhehe and returned to the coast, largely negating the purpose of the expedition.

There was then an uneasy peace between Mkwawa and the Germans, although Prince continued to conduct operations on the northern fringes of Uhehe. Prince was on leave in Germany from the end of 1895 until his return to Dar es Salaam in May 1896. He had been promoted to captain, and with his new bride, the former Magdalene von Massow, he set out to establish a new station at Perondo, in the southeast foothills of the Uhehe plateau.

In August 1896 Prince advanced into Uhehe. He encountered some resistance, but Mkwawa retreated, unwilling to meet the Germans in a pitched battle. In September Prince established a new station at Iringa, about twelve kilometres east of Mkwawa's destroyed fortress at Kalenga. To permanently weaken the Hehe kingdom, Prince divided it into two parts. In the western half, the Sangu chief, Merere, was installed as ruler on 10 December 1896. In the eastern half, Mkwawa's brother, Mpangile, was installed as ruler on 24 December. Although Mkwawa was still at large, Prince deceived himself that the Hehe were now largely pacified.

The situation soon deteriorated. Mpangile was secretly in contact with Mkwawa, and when Prince discovered this, he had Mpangile executed on 22 February 1897. A local missionary described the execution: "The mood of the people was not pleasant. From the scaffold, Mpangile urged the Hehe to join Mkwawa in waging war on the Europeans. Henceforth they should employ deceit to murder their opponents." The Hehe took Mpangile at his word, and Uhehe was soon in rebellion. Mkwawa conducted a very effective guerrilla operation, making use of the rugged terrain to avoid pitched battles with the large German force arrayed against him.

Eduard von Liebert, who had recently taken up the post of governor, was a military man with no experience of African warfare. In July and August 1897 he personally led an expedition to Uhehe, which proved inconclusive. As Liebert later conceded,

I have had practical experience of warfare in Bohemia and France, and for thirty years I have never ceased to occupy myself with military science, and especially with military history, but what I encountered here in Uhehe was beyond anything which has yet been seen … I had originally imagined that I would make my journey into the interior of the colony with just a horsewhip in my hand, and that I would travel through most places largely without violence.

To destroy support for Mkwawa, the Germans instituted a scorched-earth policy in Uhehe, reducing much of the population to starvation. Early in January 1898 Prince was able to report on the capture of Mkwawa's camp in the Udzungwa Mountains. He noted that "Many of these people were just skin and bones. In this whole camp of 1,000 souls we did not find a single bag of corn. Even in Mkwawa's hut there were only sweet potatoes." Mkwawa was increasingly isolated, and hotly pursued. He killed himself and his last companion on 19 July 1898, not far north of Kalenga. Sergeant-Major Hans Merkl cut off Mkwawa's head and took it back to the station at Iringa. Magdalene Prince recorded that

Tom took a photograph of Mkwawa's head. No European can claim to have seen Mkwawa's face before, and even in death this most powerful and energetic of all native princes would not allow his mortal enemies to see his real face, because he shot himself in the head and his features had thus been deformed. Nonetheless the characteristic features of the head could still be seen: the small face with unusual slit-like eyes which were however comparatively large, the strong nose, the thick lips, of which the lower hung noticeably downwards, almost as far as the strongly protruding, energetic chin. This chin, the thick lips, and the thrusting jaws gave the head a distinct air of cruelty and willpower.

== Aftermath ==
The Germans sent Mkwawa's head to Germany. Mkwawa and the Hehe had become so well known that a clause was inserted in the Treaty of Versailles ordering the skull be returned to Uhehe. It was found, not in Berlin, but in Bremen, and was finally returned, not to Iringa, but to nearby Kalenga, and not until 1956. The identity of the skull, however, is questionable. Mkwawa still today has the status of a national hero in Tanzania, even after over one hundred years. The Wahehe never again revolted, not even during or after the Maji Maji Rebellion.

== See also ==
- Chief Mkwawa
- German East Africa
