= Friedrich von Schele =

German military officer and colonial administrator

Freiherr Friedrich von Schele
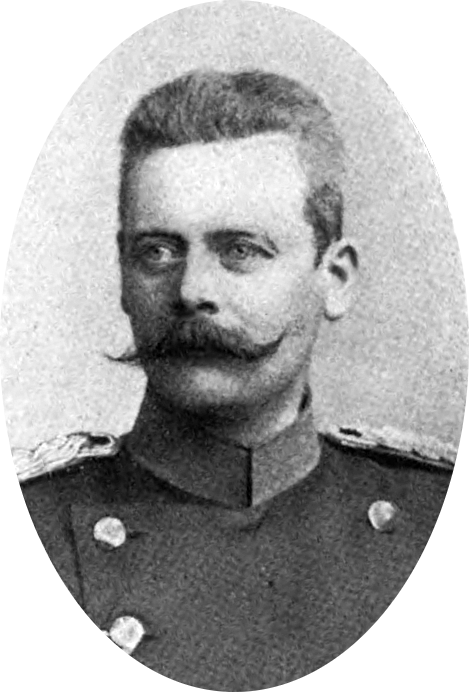

3rd Reichskommissar of German East Africa
- In office 15 September 1893 – 25 April 1895
- Deputy: Lothar von Trotha
- Preceded by: Julius von Soden
- Succeeded by: Hermann Wissmann

Personal details
- Born: 15 September 1847 Berlin, Kingdom of Prussia
- Died: 20 July 1904 (aged 56) Berlin, Prussia, German Empire
- Awards: Pour le Merite

Military service
- Allegiance: Kingdom of Prussia (1863–1871); German Empire (1871–1904)
- Branch/service: Prussian Army
- Years of service: 1863–1904
- Rank: Generalleutnant
- Battles/wars: Austro-Prussian War; Franco-Prussian War; Wahehe rebellion

Friedrich Rabod Freiherr von Schele (15 September 1847 – 20 July 1904) was a German military officer and colonial administrator who served as governor of German East Africa from 1893 to 1895.

== Early life and career ==
Friedrich was born in Berlin to Werner Von Schele (1814–1869) and Marie Eichhorn (1822–1861). He joined the officer corps of the Prussian Army in 1865 and was commissioned as a second lieutenant. Von Schele first saw combat during the Austro-Prussian War as an officer in the cavalry. During the Franco-Prussian War, von Schele was appointed Deputy Adjutant of the 2nd Guards Cavalry Brigade, and served as an orderly officer to Prince Albert of Prussia. In 1877, von Schele was promoted to Rittmeister of the 2nd Hanoverian Dragoons.

By 1891, von Schele had attained the rank of major and was appointed head of the cavalry department in the Ministry of War.

== Colonial service ==
In 1892, von Schele was promoted to colonel, and was assigned commander of the Schutztruppe in German East Africa, beginning a gradual conquest of the East African interior. He crushed a revolt by the Nyamwezi under chief Isike, before leading a campaign against Chaga king Mangi Meli, capturing the king's base at Moshi in Kilimanjaro. In September 1893, Schele was appointed Reichskommissar of the colony.

Upon his appointment as governor, Schele quickly began a pacification campaign against the Mbunga tribe, which had been fighting a rebellion against German rule since 1889. Von Schele led the Schutztruppe in an expedition along the Rufiji River in search of Mbunga chieftain Lubiki-w-mtu, during which German troops torched and looted villages and killed around 250 Mbunga. Lubiki-w-mtu was eventually captured and was hanged in front of his own subjects on 20 December 1893, after which von Schele declared that all the Mbunga were now subjects of Wilhelm II, and any further "marauding, plundering or slaving" by the Mbunga would be prohibited.

In March 1894, Schele's troops suppressed an uprising led by slave trader Bwana Heri, who had previously rebelled against the Germans during the Abushiri revolt three years earlier. In October of that year, von Schele initiated a new military campaign against the Hehe tribe and their leader, Chief Mkwawa. The Schutztruppe attacked and took Mkwawa's stone fortress at Kalenga on 28 October, though were unable to capture the chief, who had escaped during the attack. Nonetheless, von Schele was awarded the Pour le Mérite, the highest order of merit in the Imperial German army, on 20 November 1894 for his successful suppression of the Hehe.

== Later life and death ==
Despite his successes, Schele's brutal methods in quelling revolts were met with harsh criticism from the German government. Furthermore, Schele's policies and campaigns were often at odds with the Imperial Colonial Office, and as a result he often clashed with civilian administrators. Eventually, in April 1895, von Schele resigned from his post in protest. Following his resignation, Schele returned to Berlin, where he became an aide-de-camp to Wilhelm II. He then served as the military governor of Mainz before being discharged from the army for medical reasons in May 1904.

Schele was married to Emma Clothilde Wilhelmine von Hammerstein (1855–1918). They had one daughter, Marie Agnes. Schele died in Berlin on 20 July 1904, aged 56.

== Honours and awards ==
- Kingdom of Prussia:
  - Knight of the Royal Order of the Crown, 4th Class with Swords, 20 September 1866; 2nd Class with Star, 10 June 1899
  - Iron Cross (1870), 2nd Class
  - Service Award Cross
  - Knight of the Order of the Red Eagle, 4th Class, 7 September 1881; 3rd Class with Bow and Swords, 1893; 2nd Class with Oak leaves and Swords on Ring, 15 September 1898; with Crown, 1899; with Star and Swords on Ring, 18 January 1902; 1st Class, 1904
  - Knight of the Pour le Mérite (military), 20 November 1894
- Baden: Grand Cross of the Order of the Zähringer Lion
- Württemberg: Commander of the Friedrich Order, 1st Class
- Austria-Hungary: Commander of the Imperial Austrian Order of Franz Joseph, with Star
- Russian Empire: Knight of the Imperial Order of Saint Prince Vladimir, 4th Class

== Bibliography ==
- Heinrich Schnee (Hrsg.): Deutsches Kolonial-Lexikon. Band 3, Leipzig 1920, S. 262.
- Gothaisches Genealogisches Taschenbuch der Freiherrlichen Häuser. 1939. 89. Jg. Justus Perthes, Gotha 1938. Zugleich Adelsmatrikel der Deutschen Adelsgenossenschaft.
- Kurt von Priesdorff: Soldatisches Führertum. Band 10, Hanseatische Verlagsanstalt Hamburg, o. O. [Hamburg], o. J. [1942], DNB 986919810, S. 267–269, Nr. 3208.
- Karl-Friedrich Hildebrand, Christian Zweng: Die Ritter des Ordens Pour le Mérite des I. Weltkriegs. Band 3: P–Z. Biblio Verlag, Bissendorf 2011, ISBN 3-7648-2586-3, S. 195–197.
