= Tom von Prince =

German military officer (1866-1914)

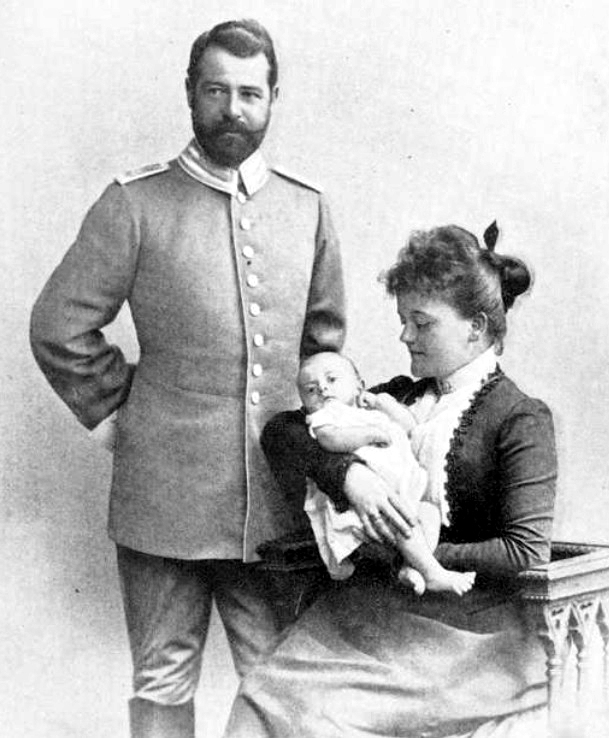
Tom and Magdalene von Prince, before 1908

Tom von Prince (9 January 1866 – 4 November 1914) was a German military officer and plantation owner in German East Africa. He most notably, as a captain in the Schutztruppe, led the first action by German forces in East Africa during World War I by seizing Taveta on 15 August 1914, and was then killed in November at the Battle of Tanga.

== Early life ==
He was born on 9 January 1866, at Port Louis, Mauritius, son of Thomas Prince, police superintendent of the British island colony of Mauritius and Mary Luisa Ansorge, who had been born in Bengal to German missionaries. His father died at Mauritius in 1869 and his mother died there in 1879. After he was orphaned, Prince's maternal grandparents took him to Germany, where he was enrolled at the Königliche Ritterakademie at Liegnitz (now Legnica in Poland). He continued his education at the Kassel Military Academy (Kadettenanstalt Kassel), where he was a classmate of his future superior Paul von Lettow-Vorbeck. He met his future wife Magdalene von Massow at Liegnitz in 1884.

== Military career ==
In 1887 he joined the Imperial German Army and served in the Prussian Infantry Regiment No. 99, which was stationed near Strasbourg. He reached the rank of Leutnant before leaving the army in 1889. In January 1890 he joined the Kaiserliche Schutztruppe fur Deutsch-Ostafrika, then still called the Wissmann-Truppe. Prince initially participated in the suppression of the Abushiri revolt, and in 1891 he took part in Wissmann's campaign to Kilimanjaro. In the following years, he participated in military expeditions to quell the Hehe people. The Hehe, under Chief Mkwavinyika Mkwawa, had won the battle of Lugalo in 1891, where they killed Commander Emil von Zelewski and many of his men. In 1893-94 Tom Prince was sent far inland to Lake Nyassa, with a civilian representative of the Antislavery Committee, Wynecken. In September 1894, Prince joined the expedition led by Governor Friedrich von Schele which attacked and captured Mkwawa's fortress at Kalenga, although Mkwawa and most of his warriors escaped.

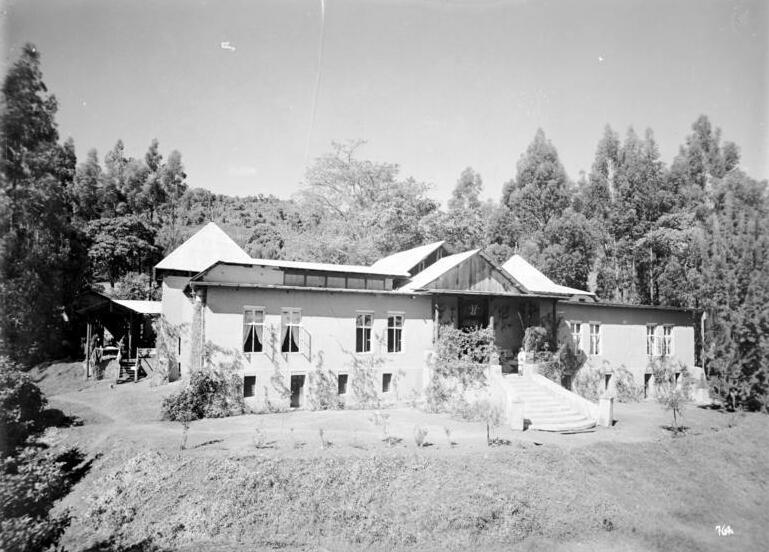
Prince Mansion at the Sakkarani plantation (Usambara, German East Africa)

Prince interrupted his service in Africa with several stays in Germany due to being afflicted with tropical diseases. There, on 4 January 1896, he married Magdalene von Massow, who returned with him to Africa. In 1896, he was promoted to the rank of Hauptmann and in August 1896 he established the German military station at Iringa, a short distance from Mkwawa's fortress at Kalenga. Faced with resistance from the Hehe people, he had Mkwawa's brother Mpangile tried for treason and hanged on 21 February 1897, then sent patrols to chase Mkwawa and his last supporters. As the fighting continued, Prince deliberately starved the rebels to break their will to fight. On 19 July 1898, closely pursued by the Germans, the Hehe chief shot himself. Soldiers brought the head of Mkwawa back to Hauptmann Prince in Iringa. Prince had one of Mkwawa's teeth set in gold as a chain pendant, which was kept in the family. The skull of Mkwawa was allegedly sent to Germany and despite its alleged return in 1954, many doubt its authenticity.

In August 1900, Prince left the protective force and colonial administration to settle as a landowner in East Africa. Together with his wife, he founded a plantation near Sakkarani in the Usambara Mountains. In December 1906, Tom Prince was raised to the German nobility and so became Tom von Prince.

== World War I and Tanga ==
At the outbreak of the First World War Prince returned to active military service and commanded two European companies of the German Schutztruppe. He was recalled to active duty as Hauptmann (captain) and given command of the Askaris of the 13th Field Company and of the 7th and 8th Schützenkompanien (rifle companies composed mainly of the sons of German settlers). Prince's exploits earned him the nickname Bwana Sakarani — the wild one — from his Askaris.

On 15 August 1914, in the opening move of the war in East Africa, von Prince seized the Kenyan town of Taveta on orders from the commander of German forces, Paul von Lettow-Vorbeck. The objective was to take and hold a key point that would strengthen German defences in the north of their colony and protect the Usambara Railway.

Tom von Prince was one of nine German officers killed in the Battle of Tanga on 4 November 1914. He had been ordered to lead his troops into the centre of the town and was killed in fighting against the British 2nd Loyal North Lancashire Regiment that had landed as part of the British Indian Expeditionary Force. His funeral took place together with twelve other German officers in Tanga.

== In popular culture ==
A thinly fictionalized version of Tom von Prince appears, under the name Erich von Bishop, in William Boyd's 1983 satirical anti-war novel An Ice-Cream War.

== Works ==
- Tom von Prince: Gegen Araber und Wahehe – Erinnerungen aus meiner ostafrikanischen Leutnantszeit 1890–1895. Mittler, Berlin 1914. English translation: Fighting the Arabs and the Hehe: The Memoirs of a German Military Officer in Tanzania, 1890-1895 (2021).

== Literature ==
- Herbert Viktor Patera: Der weiße Herr Ohnefurcht – Das Leben des Schutztruppenhauptmanns Tom von Prince. Deutscher Verlag, Berlin 1939.
- Hans Schmiedel: "Bwana Sakkarani – Der Schutztruppenhauptmann Tom von Prince und seine Zeit". Handschriftliches Manuskript
