= Kalenga =

Ward in Iringa, Tanzania

Kalenga Kata ya Kalenga
- Ward
- Location within Tanzania
- Coordinates: 7°48′S 35°36′E
- Country: Tanzania
- Region: Iringa Region
- District: Iringa Rural
- Ward: Kalenga

Population (2016)
  - Total: 7,286
- Time zone: UTC+3 (EAT)
- Postcode: 51201

Kalenga is an administrative ward in the Iringa Rural district of the Iringa Region of Tanzania. In 2016 the Tanzania National Bureau of Statistics reported its population to be 7,286, up from 6,963 in 2012.

Kalenga, which is situated along the side-lines of the Great Ruaha River, is one among the historical villages of "Iringa". It is known for being the residence of the famous Chief Mtwa Mkwawa of the Hehe tribe, who resisted German colonization. Mkwawa fortified the village with a wall 4 meters high and 5 kilometers in circumference. The town was stormed by a German force in 1894, and the fortifications were destroyed. Mkwawa continued to resist until 1898, when he was finally hunted down by the Germans and committed suicide. His head was cut off and sent to Germany, but eventually returned in 1954; his skull is now on display in a small museum in Kalenga.

== Villages and vitongoji ==
The ward has 3 villages and 16 vitongoji.

- Tosamaganga
  - Ipamba
  - Irangi
  - Mabanda
  - Tosa kilimani
  - Unyangwila
- Kalenga
  - Galinoma
  - Igawa
  - Ilundimembe
  - Kidope
  - Lipuli
  - Maktaba
  - Mwambao
  - Wangi
- Isakalilo
  - Isakalilo A
  - Isakalilo B
  - Isakalilo C

== Gallery ==
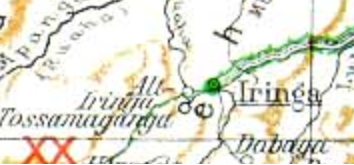
A 1914 map German shows Iringa and its railway station as "Alt-Iringa", nowadays known as Kalenga

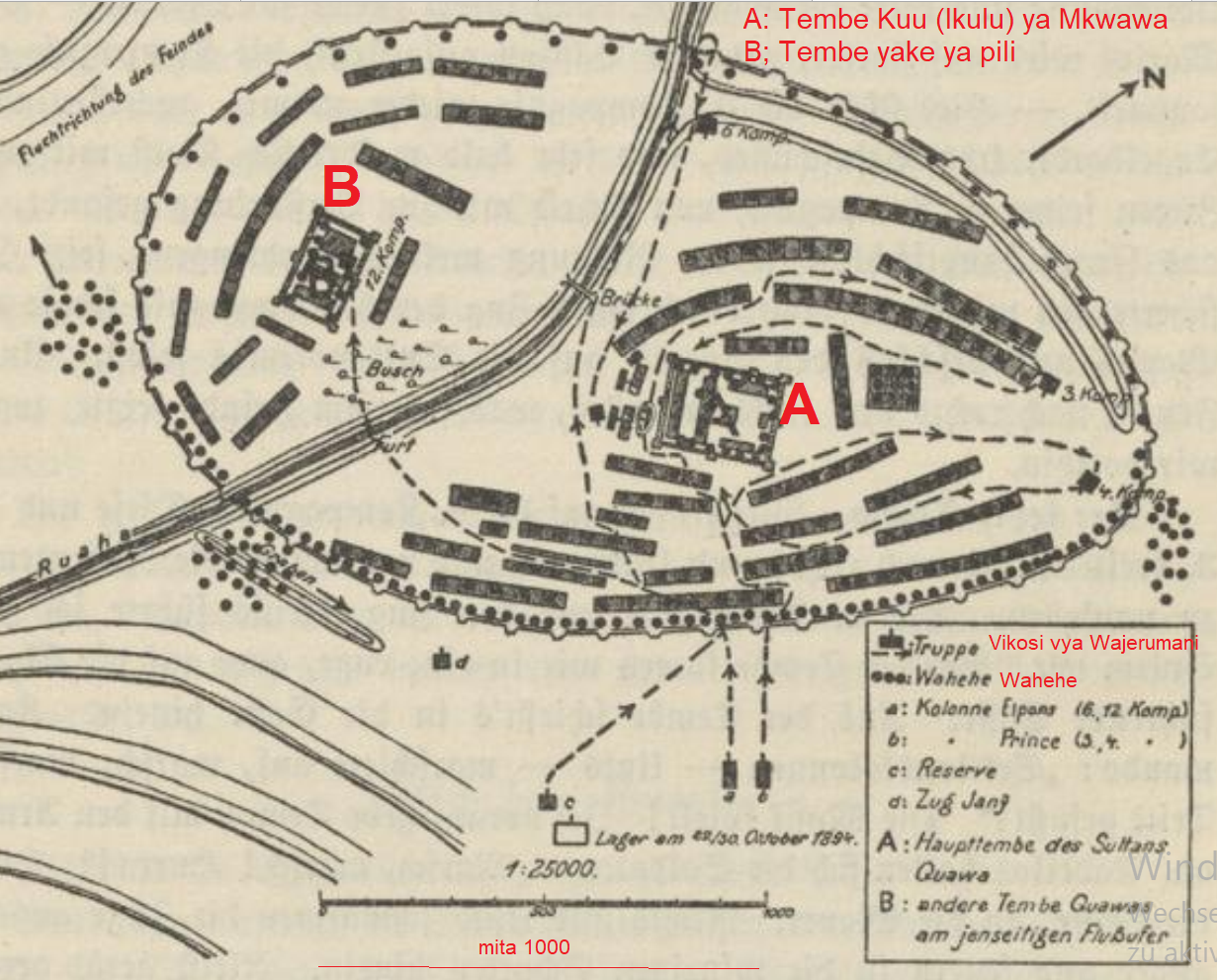
Map (1897) showing the German attack

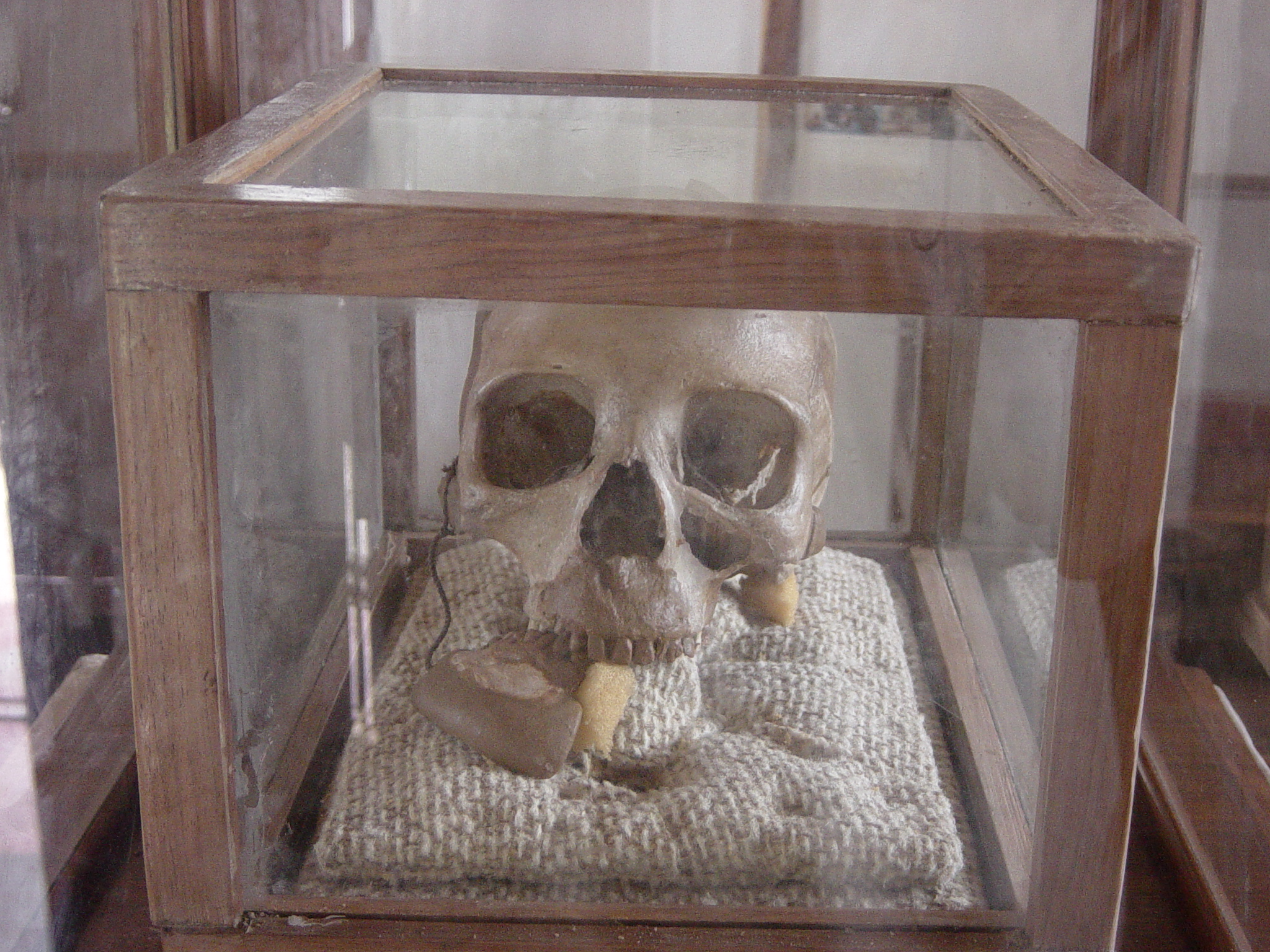
Skull of Mkwawa displayed at Kalenga
