= Chief Mkwawa =

Hehe tribal leader in German East Africa (1855–1898)

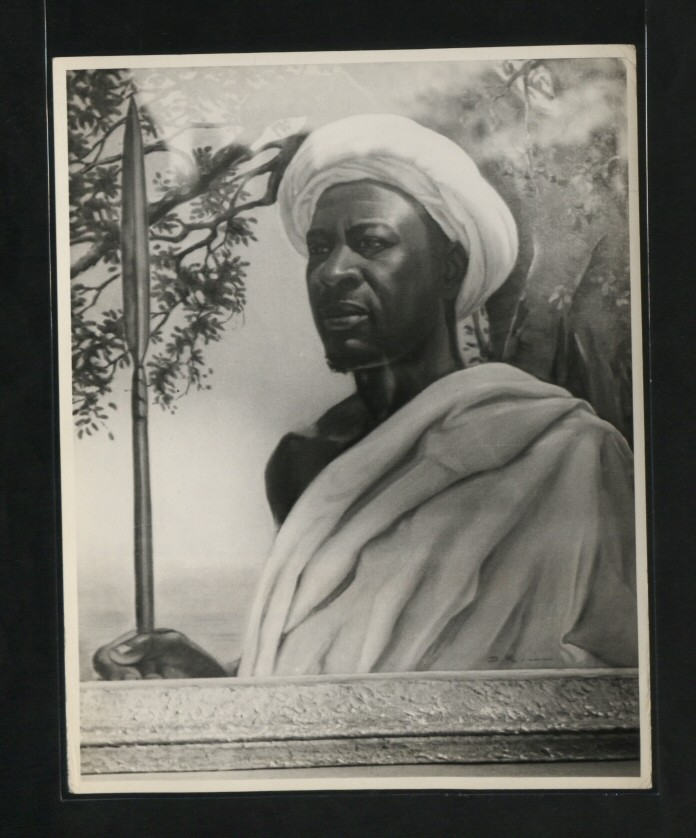
Chief Mkwawa

Chief Mkwavinyika Munyigumba Mwamuyinga (c. 1855 – 19 July 1898 (Note: According to the Report of the German soldier, who found the corpse of Mkwawa, the date of Mkwawa's death was definitely 19 July 1898)), more commonly known as Chief Mkwawa or Sultan Mkwawa, was a ruler of the Hehe Chiefdom in German East Africa, based in Kalenga, Iringa region, who opposed the German colonization. The name "Mkwawa" is derived from Mukwava, a shortened form of Mukwavinyika, meaning "conqueror of many lands".

As a young child he was named Ndesalasi, meaning "troublemaker". As an adult he was named Mtwa Mkwava Mkwavinyika Mahinya Yilimwiganga Mkali Kuvagosi Kuvadala Tage Matenengo Manwiwage Seguniwagula Gumganga, meaning: "A leader who takes control of the forests, who is aggressive to men and polite to women, who is unpredictable and unbeatable, and who has the power that it is only death who can take him away."

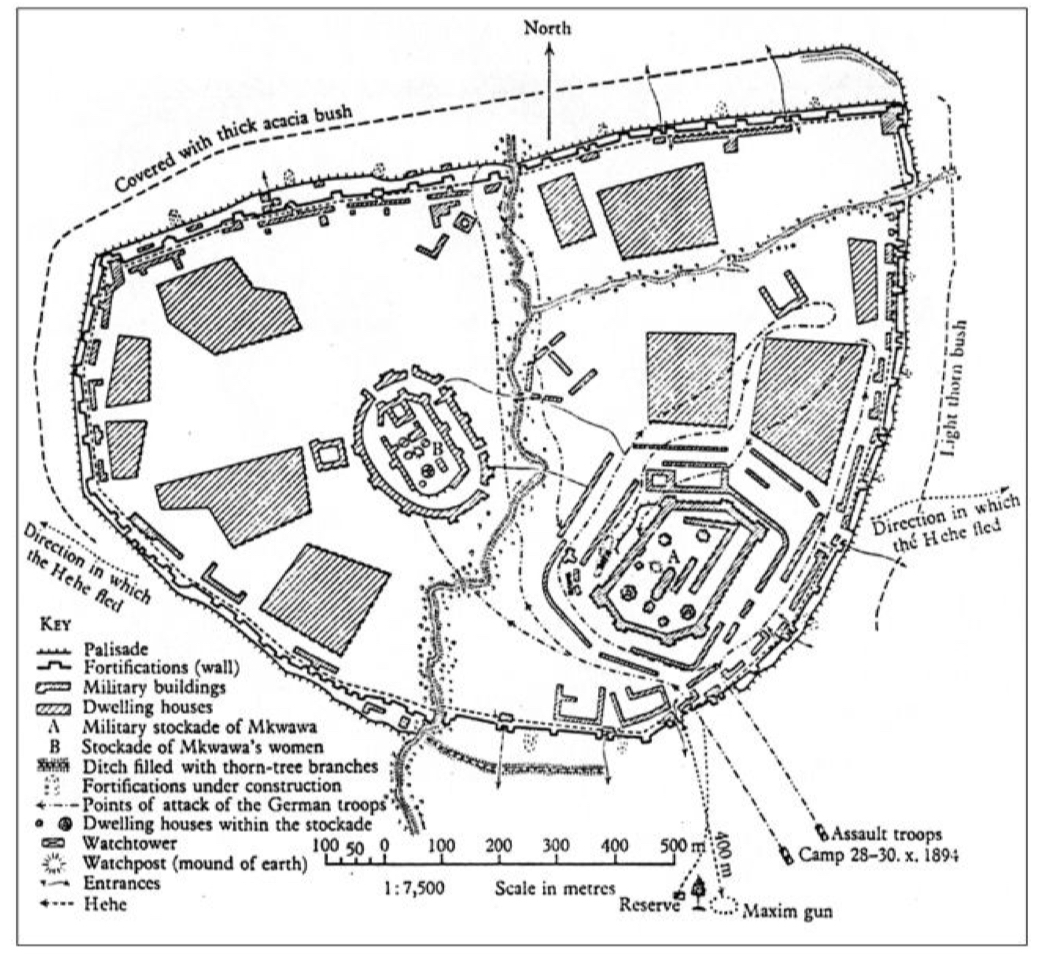
Mkwawa's fort at Kalenga in 1894, illustrated by Von Schele

== Life ==
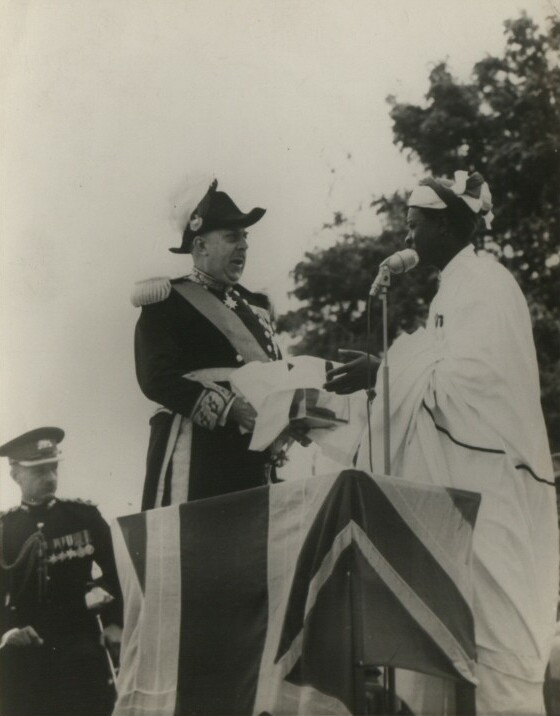
Sir Edward Twining returning the skull

Mkwawa was born in Luhota and was the son and successor of Sultan Munyigumba, who died in 1879.

In July 1891, the German commissioner Emil von Zelewski led a battalion of soldiers (320 askaris with officers and porters) to suppress the Hehe. On 17 August, they were attacked by Mkwawa's 3,000-strong army at Lugalo, who, despite only being equipped with spears and a few guns, quickly overpowered the Germans and killed Zelewski.

On 28 October 1894, the Germans, under the new commissioner Colonel Freiherr Friedrich von Schele, attacked Mkwawa's fortress at Kalenga. Although they took the fort, Mkwawa managed to escape. Subsequently, Mkwawa conducted a campaign of guerrilla warfare, harassing the Germans until 1898 when, on 19 July, he was surrounded and shot himself to avoid capture at the site of the Mlambalasi Rock Shelter. Mkwawa's body was buried a few meters away from the rockshelter.

His brother Chambila, who was given the name (roughly meaning "hero") for his heroism in battle, fought alongside him to his last breath. Mkwawa and his brother descended from an immigrant from the North named Mufwimi, a traditional name meaning "a hunter".

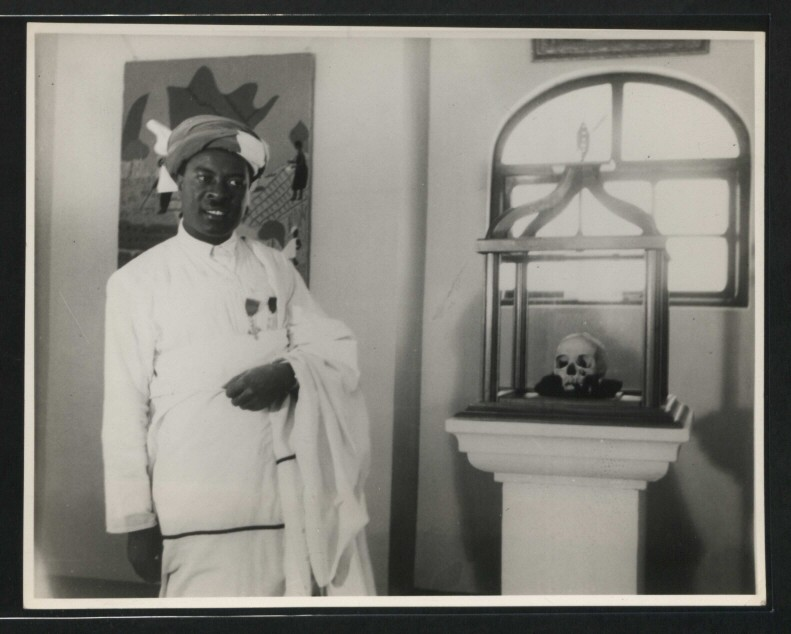
Skull on display at the Mkwawa Memorial Museum

== Skull ==
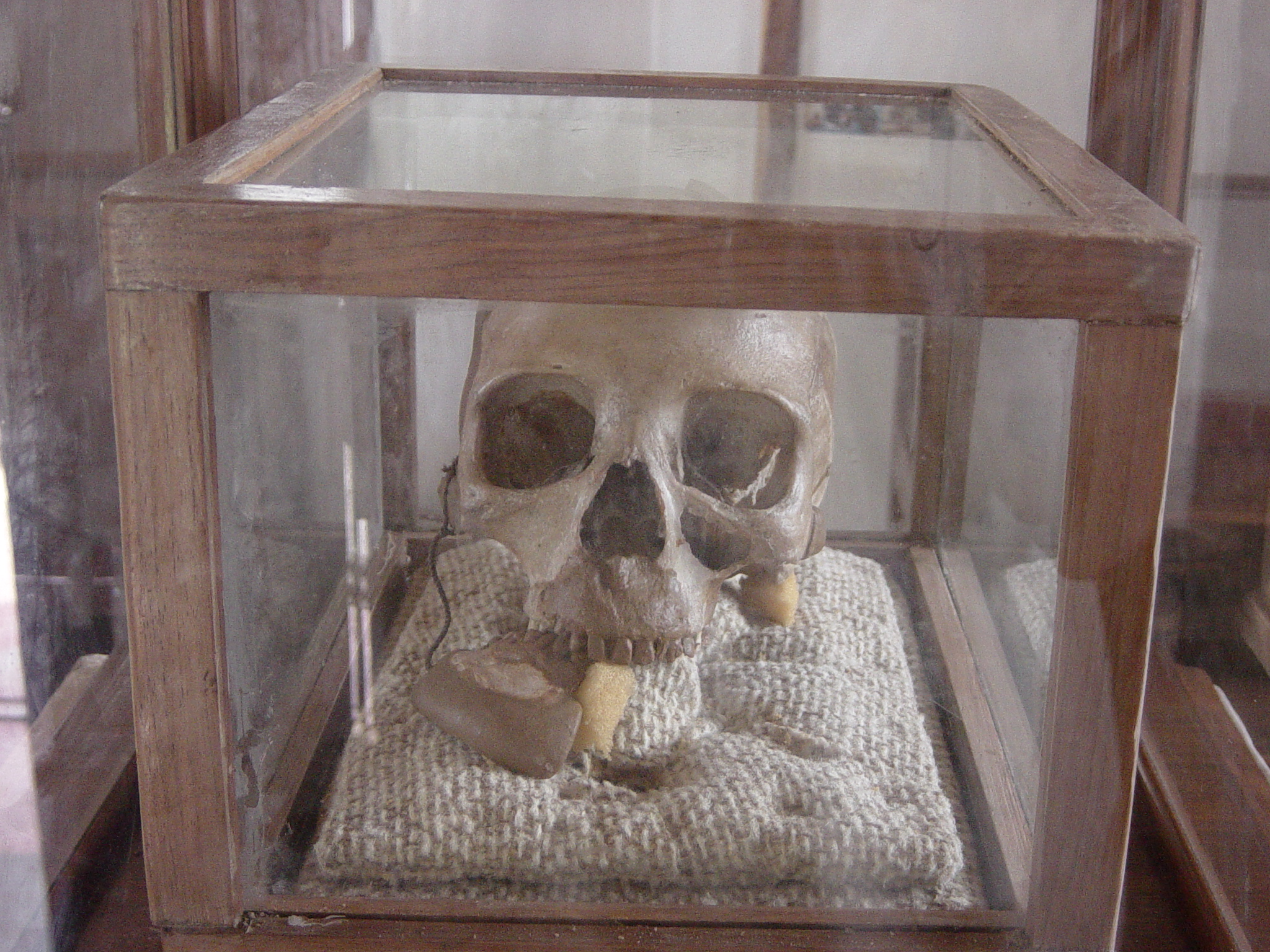
Skull on display at the Mkwawa Memorial Museum

After his death, German soldiers removed Mkwawa's head. The skull was sent to Berlin and probably ended up in the Übersee-Museum Bremen. In 1918 the then British Administrator of German East Africa Horace Byatt proposed to his government that it should demand a return of the skull to Tanganyika in order to reward the Wahehe for their cooperation with the British during the war and in order to have a symbol assuring the locals of the definitive end of German power. The skull's return was stipulated in the 1919 Treaty of Versailles:

ARTICLE 246. Within six months from the coming into force of the present Treaty, ... Germany will hand over to His Britannic Majesty's Government the skull of the Sultan Mkwawa which was removed from the Protectorate of German East Africa and taken to Germany.

The Germans disputed that Mkwawa's skull had been removed from East Africa and the British government took the position that the whereabouts could not be traced. However, after World War II the Governor of Tanganyika, Sir Edward Twining, took up the issue again. After enquiries he was directed to the Bremen Museum which he visited himself in 1953. The Museum had a collection of 2000 skulls, 84 of which originated from the former German East Africa. He short-listed the ones which showed measurements similar to surviving relatives of Chief Mkwawa; from this selection he picked the only skull with a bullet-hole as the skull of chief Mkwawa. The skull was finally returned on 9 July 1954, and now resides at the Mkwawa Memorial Museum in Kalenga, near the town of Iringa.

== See also ==
- Maji Maji Rebellion
