= Julius von Soden =

German colonial administrator and politician

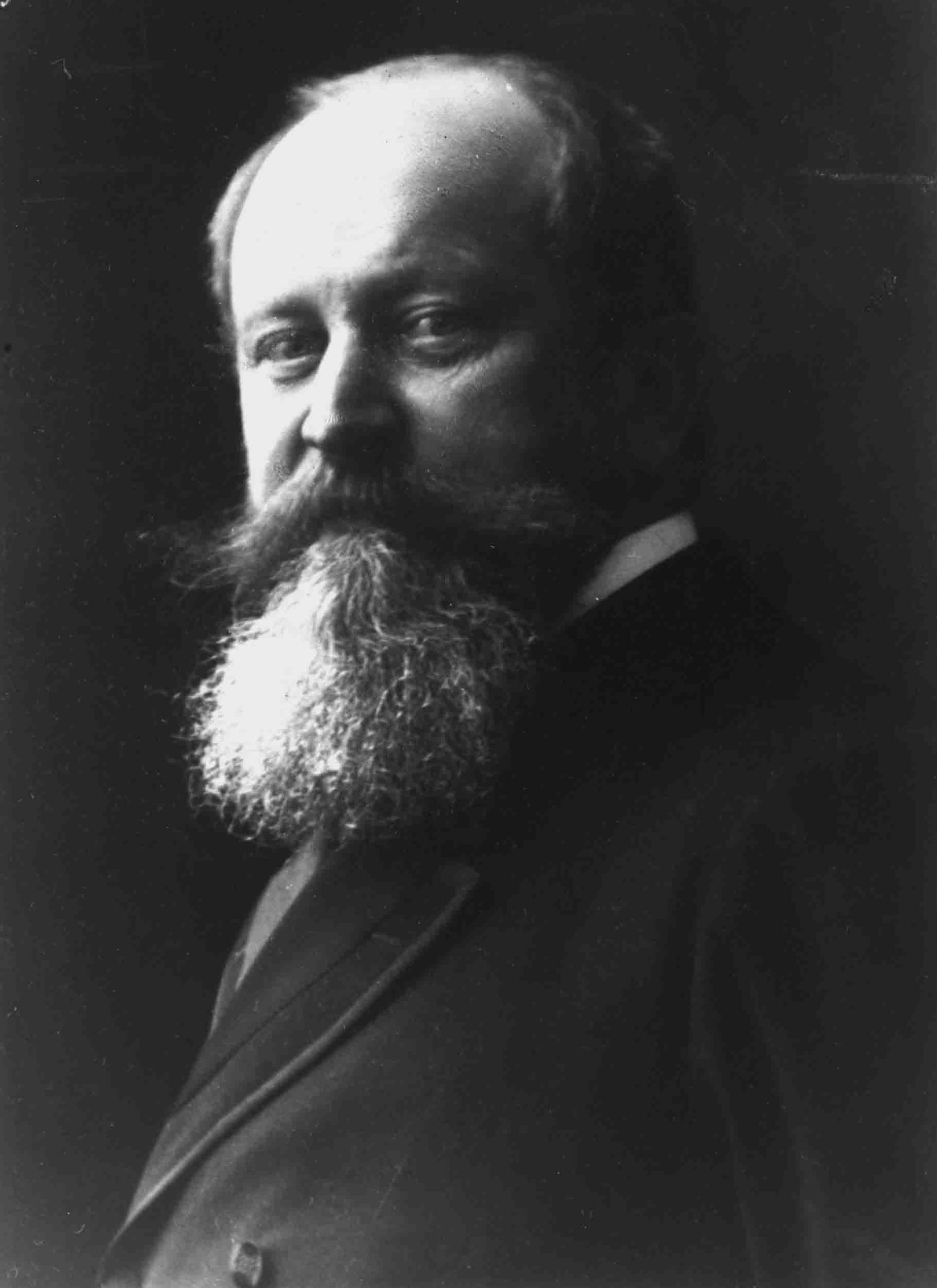

2nd Reichskommissar of German East Africa
- In office 21 February 1891 – 15 September 1893
- Preceded by: Carl Peters
- Succeeded by: Friedrich von Schele

2nd Gouverneur of Kamerun
- In office 4 July 1885 – 14 February 1891
- Preceded by: Gustav Nachtigal
- Succeeded by: Eugen von Zimmerer

Personal details
- Born: 5 February 1846 Ludwigsburg, Wurttemberg, Kingdom of Württemberg
- Died: 2 February 1921 (aged 74) Tubingen, Wurttemberg, Weimar Republic

Military service
- Allegiance: Kingdom of Württemberg
- Branch/service: Royal Württembergian Army
- Years of service: 1870-1871
- Unit: 4th Württemberg Cavalry
- Battles/wars: Franco-Prussian War

Julius Freiherr von Soden (5 February 1846 – 2 February 1921) was a German colonial administrator and politician. He was the Governor of the colonies of Kamerun and German East Africa, and later became Chef de Cabinet and Foreign Minister of the King of Württemberg.

== Youth and education ==
Julius von Soden was born on 5 February 1846 in the barracks of the 7th Infantry Regiment in Ludwigsburg, where his father was lieutenant colonel. He was a member of the Evangelical Church. In 1849 the family moved to Stuttgart. His parents died early. His mother, whose maiden name had been Marie von Neurath, died on 28 March 1849, and his father Julius on 13 April 1854. Soden and his three older sisters were raised by his grandmother, Charlotte von Neurath. (Note: She was the widow of the King of Wurtemberg's Minister of Justice Constantin Franz Fürchtegott von Neurath and the mother of another Württemberg Minister, Constantin Franz von Neurath.)

Soden started school in Korntal, then went on to high school in Stuttgart. His temporary tutor Julius Klaiber and his schoolmasters in high school inspired him with an interest in antiquity, and he aspired to become a classical scholar. Throughout his life, Soden enjoyed classical authors, especially Homer and Dante. His view of the world was at first strongly influenced by David Strauss and then increasingly by Immanuel Kant.

After leaving school in 1864, Soden began the study of law at the University of Tübingen, where he joined the Corps Suevia Tübingen, a student duelling society. In the fourth semester, he moved to Göttingen. The Austro-Prussian War of 1866 created a problem, since Soden had by then become a reserve officer and was a strong supporter of the Prussian Otto von Bismarck, while his family sympathized with Austria. He avoided the problem by remaining in Göttingen on the basis that it was impossible to travel to the south in wartime, only returning to Tübingen for his examinations in 1869.

Soden then became a law clerk in Heilbronn, even though he had more interest in jurisprudence. When the Franco-Prussian War broke out in 1870, Soden was an enthusiastic volunteer, serving in the 4th Württemberg Cavalry. He saw little action, and when peace returned left the military and returned to his legal studies, passing his second legal examination in the fall of 1871.

== Travel and consulates ==
Julius von Soden felt an urge to travel and see the world. He heard that German consuls, who had usually been merchants, were being replaced by civil servants, often lawyers, and took up a consular career, ready to go anywhere. He first obtained a position as vice-consul in Bucharest, then in 1872, after half a year, transferred to the newly established German consulate in Algiers.

Soden loved to travel and, in the next few years, made many long voyages. After his first voyage from Marseilles to Algiers, in 1876 he was sent to Canton and then Hong Kong. In 1879, he was assigned to Havana. From 1881 to 1882, he was Resident Representative of the Minister to Lima, and, in 1884, he was Consul General to St. Petersburg. In these positions, he came to the conclusion that promotion of trade contacts was a job for businessmen, not consuls. He began to take a broad view of the economic importance of developing German industry, shipping, and trade, he did see most places.

== West Africa ==
With the tentative start of German colonialism, Soden moved from a diplomatic into an administrative role. In July 1884, he was appointed as the first head commissioner of the German colony of Togoland. A year later, in March 1885, he was appointed by Kaiser Wilhelm I as the first governor of Kamerun. Chancellor Otto von Bismarck had a negative attitude towards Soden's colonial aspirations and gave him few instructions.

Soden's job was made difficult by lack of resources to support a colonial empire and by lack of infrastructure. Without a telegraph system, it was very difficult to simultaneously fulfill the offices of Chief Commissioner of Togoland and Consul General of the Gulf of Guinea.

In the circumstances, Soden emphasized a strategy of "peaceful" development of the "protected area", with the goal of maximizing the economic benefits of the colony. He envisioned a network of schools throughout the colony, with teachers to follow merchants, planters and officials. The schools would assist missionary activity as well as industrial and commercial enterprises.

Soden quickly realized the potential of Cameroon for plantations, and encouraged the Hamburg-based Land- und Plantagengesellschaft in their project in Man O' War Bay. He established an advisory council under the governor, an arbitration court, and an initial customs administration. He brought the trade in spirits and arms under control.

He dealt with risings in 1886 and 1887 caused by attempts by the government to break the monopoly that the coastal tribes had over trade with the interior. Although his policy was apparently succeeding, during a vacation at home from 13 May 1887 to 17 January 1888, he was invited by Bismarck to Friedrichsruh, where he learned that there had not been more enthusiasm for German colonial policy than before. Bismark's fall from power in 1890 did not immediately relieve him of his difficulties.

== East Africa ==
In 1890, the new German Chancellor Leo von Caprivi asked for a study of the prospects for establishing a new colony in East Africa. Despite a sobering report, the project went ahead, and Soden was appointed governor of the colony of German East Africa on 1 January 1891. However, in his new post Soden was handicapped by infrastructure problems and by constant interference by the Foreign Office in Berlin.

Without consulting him, the government appointed three commissioners with vague powers: Eduard Schnitzer, known as Emin Pasha, Carl Peters, and Hermann von Wissmann, Soden's two immediate predecessors in the colonial administration. Soden was handicapped in his main task of reorganizing the local security forces by being a civilian whose authority was not readily recognized by the military. He found that the principles of colonial policy that he had formulated over years of experience were in conflict with the "global politics" of Kaiser Wilhelm II.

Soden founded the first secular state school, the Tanga School, against the wishes of the home government. His objective was to train Swahili-speaking junior administrators who would help him in his policy of limiting administration to the coast and using the coastal people as his intermediaries in establishing trade links with the interior. To overcome the distrust of a purely secular education by the upper-class Swahili families, a Koranic teacher was employed, but he was swiftly dismissed after the missionary lobby caused an uproar in Germany. In 1893, frustrated by the obstacles imposed on his administration from Berlin, Soden asked Chancellor Caprivi to allow him to retire.

== Later career ==
For the six years following his retirement, Soden lived on his estate in Germany, for the first time undertaking the duties of a landowner. He also traveled throughout Germany, coming into closer contact with the governments of the states, and also continued to be involved in colonial affairs as a consultant.

In 1896, he became a member of the board of the West Africa Plantations Company (Westafrikanische Pflanzungsgesellschaft), an enterprise in Cameroon.

In 1899, Soden was surprised to be offered the post of Chief of Cabinet at the court of King William II of Württemberg. He accepted, and experienced success in this different role compared to his previous offices. He was trusted and respected by the king as his temperament was valued.

On 1 September 1900, Soden married Helene von Sick (born 1856), a daughter of Major-General Hermann von Sick of Ludwigsburg. Julius was 54 years old, ten years older than his bride. Their marriage was childless, probably due to the bride's advanced age.

In November 1900, Soden left the King's cabinet and became foreign minister in the Württemberg State Government. In this position, he promoted improvements in the transport sector, driving forward the unification of the railroads and expanding the Württemberg branch lines. He resigned from this post in 1906, and resumed his former post as royal cabinet chief, remaining in office until 1916. He also accepted various honorary positions, including that of chairman of the Swabian Schiller Society (1900 to 1902 and 1906 to 1917).

After the war and the November Revolution, Soden decided to resume his studies. In September 1920, aged 74, he returned to Tübingen, where he attended lectures. His chosen subjects were spiritual in nature, philosophy, philology and aesthetics.

His retirement was short. A few months after a new semester began in January 1921, Soden suffered a physical collapse, and on 2 February 1921, after a 14-day illness, he died three days before his 75th birthday.
