= German East Africa =

German colony, 1885–1918

Coordinates: 02°24′47″S 30°32′37″E

German East Africa Deutsch-Ostafrika (German)
- 1885–1918
- Service flag of the Colonial Office Coat of arms of the German Empire
- Anthem: "Heil dir im Siegerkranz" (German) (English: "'Hail to Thee in the Victor's Crown")
- German East Africa Other German possessions German Empire
- Status: Colony of Germany
- Capital: Bagamoyo (1885–1890); Dar es Salaam (1890–1916); Tabora (1916, temporary)
- Common languages: German (official); Swahili; Arabic; Kirundi; Kinyarwanda; Maa; Kisukuma; Iraqw; Chaga languages
- Religion: Islam; Traditional African religions; Christianity (Catholic Church and Lutheranism)
- Government
- Emperor
  - 1885–1888: Wilhelm I
  - 1888: Frederick III
  - 1888–1918: Wilhelm II
- Governor
  - 1885–1891 (first): Carl Peters
  - 1912–1918 (last): Heinrich Schnee
- Historical era: New Imperialism
  - Established by the DOAG: 27 February 1885
  - Heligoland–Zanzibar Treaty: 1 July 1890
  - Maji Maji Rebellion: 21 October 1905
  - East African campaign: 3 August 1914
  - Surrender: 25 November 1918
  - Formal disestablishment: 28 June 1919

Area
- 1912: 995,000 km^{2} (384,000 sq mi)

Population
  - 1912: 7,700,000
- Currency: German East African rupie
Preceded by
German East Africa Company
Zanzibar
Rwanda
Burundi
Hehe
Succeeded by
Tanganyika
Ruanda-Urundi
Mozambique
- Today part of: Burundi; Rwanda; Tanzania; Mozambique

German East Africa (GEA; German: Deutsch-Ostafrika DOA) was a German colony in the African Great Lakes region, which included present-day Burundi, Rwanda, the Tanzania mainland, and the Kionga Triangle, a small region later incorporated into Mozambique. GEA's area was 994,996 km^{2} (384,170 sq mi), which is nearly three times the area of present-day Germany and almost double the area of metropolitan Germany at the time.

The colony was organised when the German military was asked in the late 1880s to put down a revolt against the activities of the German East Africa Company. It ended with Imperial Germany's defeat in World War I. Ultimately the territory was divided amongst Britain, Belgium and Portugal, and was reorganised as a mandate of the League of Nations.

== History ==
Like other colonial powers, the Germans expanded their empire in the Africa Great Lakes region, ostensibly to explore the region's rich resources and its people. Unlike other imperial powers, however, they never formally abolished either slavery or the slave trade and preferred instead to curtail the production of new "recruits", regulating the existing business of slavery.

The colony began when Carl Peters, an adventurer and the founder of the Society for German Colonization, signed treaties with several native chieftains on the mainland which is opposite Zanzibar. On 3 March 1885, the German government announced that it had granted an imperial charter, which was signed by Chancellor Otto von Bismarck on 27 February 1885. The charter was granted to Peters' company and was intended to establish a protectorate in the African Great Lakes region. Peters then recruited specialists who began exploring south to the Rufiji River and north to Witu, near Lamu on the coast.

The Sultan of Zanzibar protested and claimed that he was the ruler of both Zanzibar and the mainland. Chancellor Bismarck sent five warships which arrived on 7 August 1885, training their guns on the Sultan's palace. The Sultan was forced to accept the German claims on the mainland outside a 16-kilometre (10 mi)-strip along the coast. In November 1886 Germany and Britain reached an agreement declaring they would respect the sovereignty of the Sultan of Zanzibar over his islands and the 16-kilometre (10 mi)-strip along the coast. They otherwise agreed on their spheres of interest along what is now the Tanzanian–Kenyan border. The British and Germans agreed to divide the mainland between themselves, and the Sultan had no option but to agree.

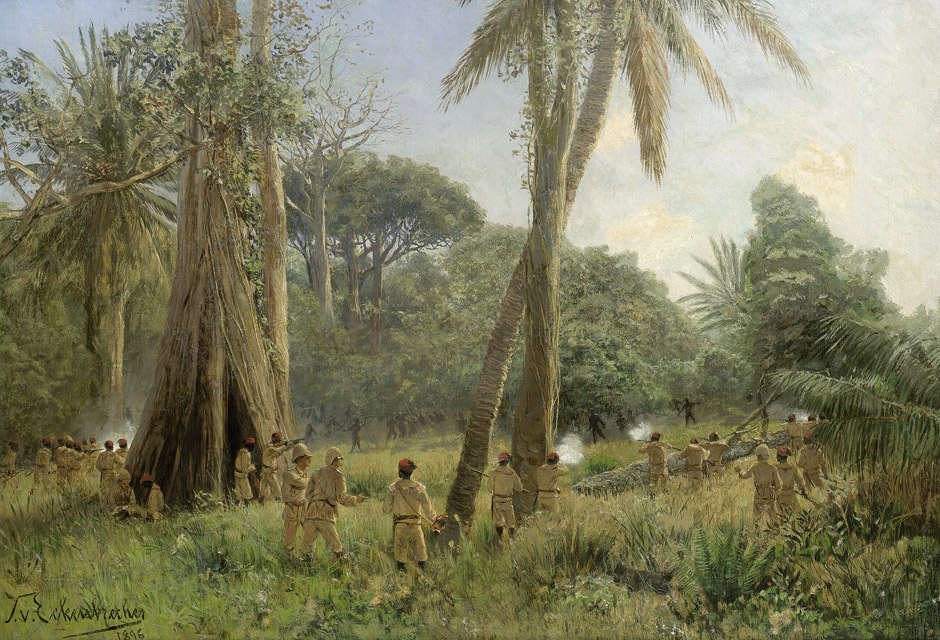
Askari soldiers under German command in 1896

German rule was established quickly over Bagamoyo, Dar es Salaam, and Kilwa. Oscar Baumann was sent to explore Masailand and Urundi. During his expedition he discovered the source of the Kagera river, the Alexandra Nile. The caravans of Tom von Prince, Wilhelm Langheld, Emin Pasha, and Charles Stokes were sent to dominate "the Street of Caravans". The Abushiri Revolt of 1888 was put down with British help the following year. In 1890, London and Berlin concluded the Heligoland–Zanzibar Treaty, which gave Heligoland to Germany and decided the border between GEA and the East Africa Protectorate controlled by Britain, although the exact boundaries remained unsurveyed until 1910.

The stretch of border between Kenya and Tanganyika, running from the sea to Lake Victoria, was surveyed by two British brothers: Charles Stewart Smith (British Consul at Mombasa) and his younger brother George Edward Smith (an officer and later a general with the Royal Engineers). Stewart Smith had been appointed British Commissioner in 1892 for the delimitation of the Anglo-German Boundary in Africa, and in the same year they both surveyed the 290-kilometre (180 mi) line from the sea to Mount Kilimanjaro. Twelve years later George Edward Smith returned to complete the survey of the remaining 480 kilometres (300 mi) from Kilimanjaro to Lake Victoria.

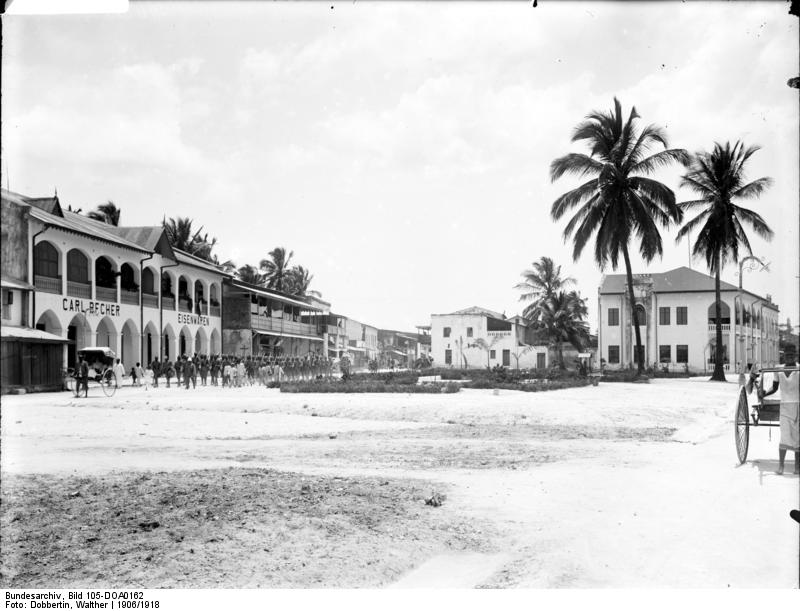
A streetscape photo of Dar es Salaam taken by Walther Dobbertin, c. 1906-1918

The German expansion was undertaken by military groups such as the notorious Wissmann Truppe, armed with modern weaponry. The Wissmann Truppe consisted of African soldiers led by German commanders. Under their command the Wissmann Truppe committed widespread atrocities. Between 1891 and 1894, the Hehe people which were led by Chief Mkwawa resisted German expansion. They were defeated because rival tribes supported the Germans. After years of guerrilla warfare, Mkwawa was cornered and committed suicide in 1898.

The colonial expansion led by Carl Peters came with considerable violence against the local populations. Carl Peters was infamous for his brutality, which had earned him the nickname "Mkono-wa-damu", or "Man with the blood-stained hands". He was known for leaving a path of destruction in his wake during his conquests, leaving entire villages slaughtered. Peters was also known for keeping a "harem" of local women, who would be completely at the mercy of Peters. In one instance, he had a woman flogged daily on suspicion of having sexual relations with another native. The native in question was hanged.

Other atrocities included rape, floggings and torture with iron rods. Flogging was so excessive that the German colonies were known by other European powers as the "flogging colonies".

These widespread atrocities caused several uprisings in the German colonies. The Maji Maji Rebellion occurred in 1905 and was put down by Governor Gustav Adolf von Götzen, who ordered measures to create a famine to crush the resistance. It may have cost as many 300,000 lives. Scandal followed with allegations of corruption and brutality. In 1907, Chancellor Bernhard von Bülow appointed Bernhard Dernburg to reform the colonial administration.

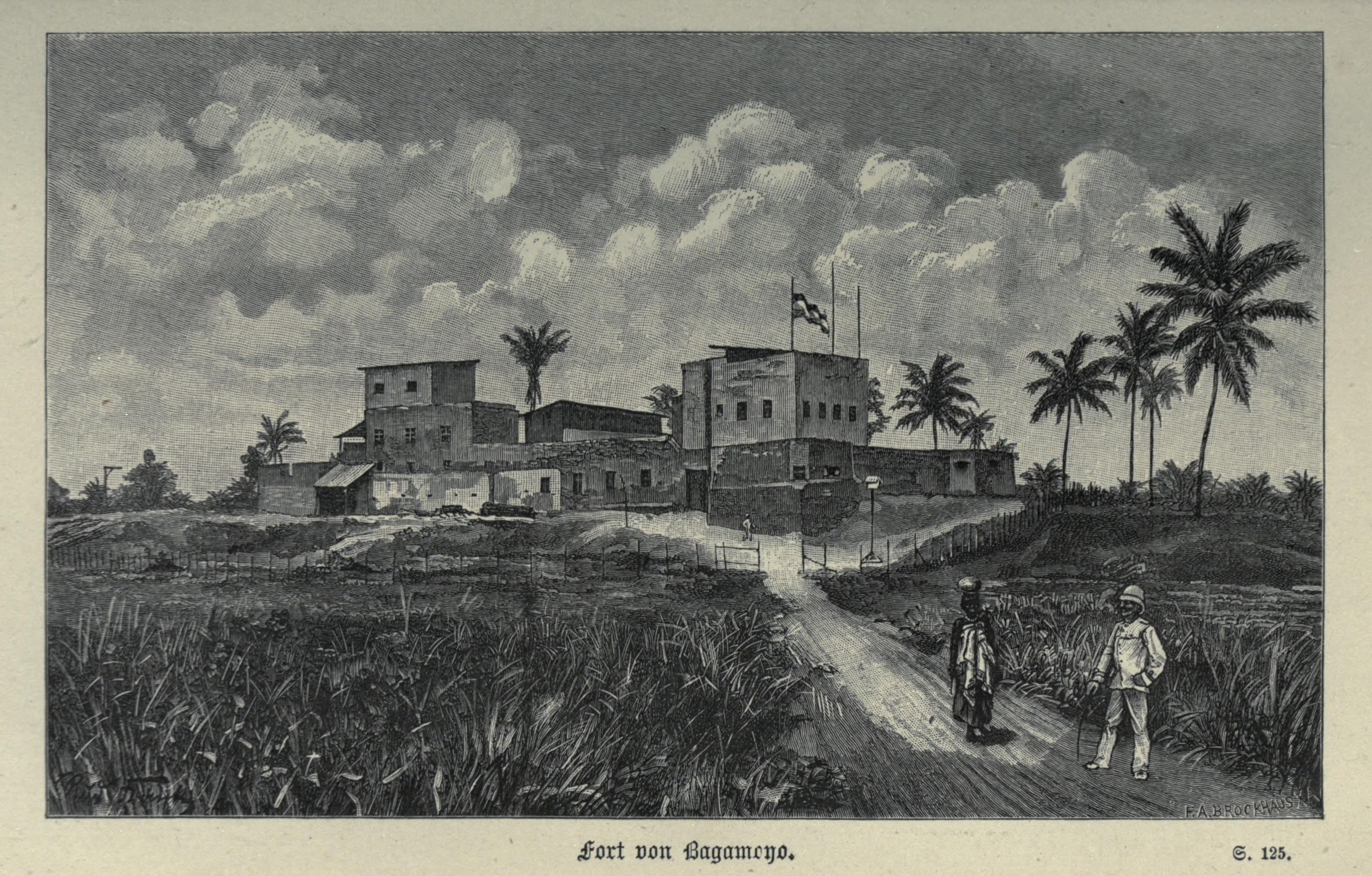
Fort Bagamoyo, c. 1891

German colonial administrators relied heavily on native chiefs to keep order and collect taxes. By 1 January 1914, not including local police, the military garrisons of the Schutztruppen (protective troops) in Dar es Salaam, Moshi, Iringa, and Mahenge numbered 110 German officers (including 42 medical officers), 126 non-commissioned officers, and 2,472 Askari (native enlisted men).

== Economic development ==
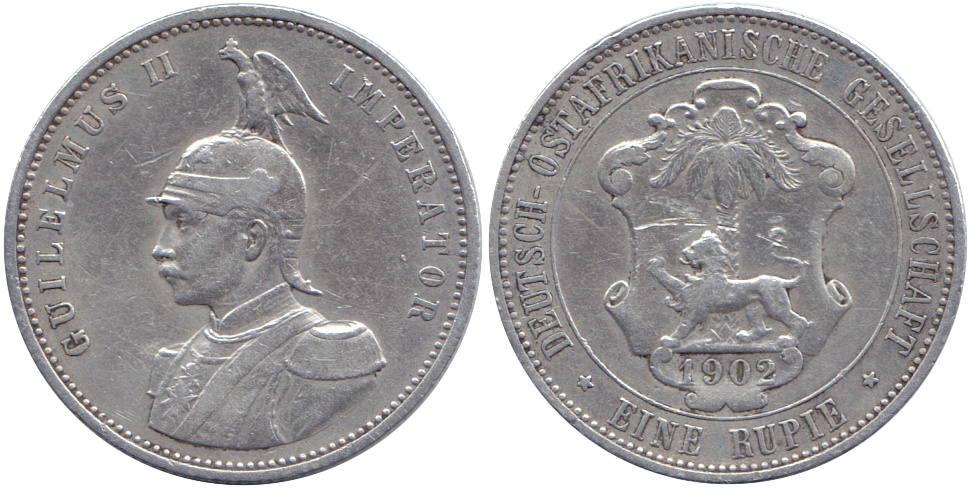
1 rupie, German East Africa, 1902. Silver 917.

Germans promoted commerce and economic growth. Over 40,000 hectares (100,000 acres) were put under sisal cultivation which was the largest cash crop. Two million coffee trees were planted, rubber trees grew on 81,000 hectares (200,000 acres), and there were large cotton plantations.

In the early years of the colony, hunting and gathering remained the basis of the export economy, and ivory and wild rubber were major exports. The African-owned plantations along the coast, on the other hand, suffered from the gradual abolition of slavery. The number of European-owned plantations rose steadily, but many of them proved unprofitable. Global markets for commodities like coffee and rubber were very unstable, and the soil and climate were not always favourable to the grower. It was only in sisal that the large plantations finally found a reliable source of income. Under the governorship of Albrecht von Rechenberg, from 1906 to 1912, the colonial administration began to place more emphasis on the economic potential of African small-holder agriculture, for which railway construction was an essential precondition. In his detailed study of the economic development of the colony, Rainer Tetzlaff came to the conclusion that "German East Africa never achieved any real significance for the German Empire, neither as a colony for the settlement of emigrants, nor as a supplier of raw materials, nor as a market for exports."

One of the great impediments to the development of plantation agriculture was the labour problem. The plantations could not function without a large African workforce, but employment conditions were often poor, not to say life-threatening. Local German officials frequently colluded with European landowners in forcing Africans to work on the plantations, although the government in Berlin had banned any form of forced labour. The various labour ordinances promulgated in Dar es Salaam were largely ignored in the interior. The social and economic impacts of large-scale labour migration on "labour reservoirs" such as Unyamwezi and Usukuma were often devastating.

Beginning in 1888 the Usambara Railway was built from Tanga to Moshi to bring these agricultural products to market. The Central Railroad covered 775 mi (1,247 km) and linked Dar es Salaam, Morogoro, Tabora, and Kigoma. The final link to the eastern shore of Lake Tanganyika was completed in July 1914 and was cause for a huge and festive celebration in the capital with an agricultural fair and trade exhibition. Harbor facilities were built or improved with electrical cranes, with rail access and warehouses. Wharves were remodeled at Tanga, Bagamoyo, and Lindi. After 1891, the German colonial administration undertook efforts to overhaul the region's caravan routes, which had existed before European colonisation, into all-weather highways, although most of these projects proved to be unsuccessful and ended in failure.

In 1912, Dar es Salaam and Tanga received 356 freighters and passenger steamers and over 1,000 coastal ships and local trading-vessels. Dar es Salaam became the showcase city of all of tropical Africa. By 1914, Dar es Salaam and the surrounding province had a population of 166,000, among them 1,000 (0.6%) Germans. In all of the GEA, there were 3,579 Germans.

Gold mining in Tanzania in modern times dates back to the German colonial period, beginning with gold discoveries near Lake Victoria in 1894. The Kironda-Goldminen-Gesellschaft established one of the first gold mines in the colony, the Sekenke Gold Mine, which began operation in 1909 after the finding of gold there in 1907.

== Slavery ==
In German Tanganyika, slavery was gradually phased out. New enslavement and commercial slave trade was banned in 1901, but private slave sales were not banned, and thousands of slaves, mostly women, were sold during 1911–1914; all slaves born after 1905 were born free; slaves who had been subjected to abuse were freed; slaves were permitted to ransom and buy their freedom, and thousands of slaves bought their freedom or left their enslavers when the Germans did not act to prevent them. In 1914, the Germans contemplated to ban slavery, but ultimately did not, since they did not consider it financially possible to compensate their owners.

== Education ==
Germany developed an educational program for Africans that included elementary, secondary, and vocational schools. In 1924, ten years after the beginning of the First World War and six years into British rule, the visiting American Phelps-Stokes Commission reported, "In regards to schools, the Germans have accomplished marvels. Some time must elapse before education attains the standard it had reached under the Germans. Instructor qualifications, curricula, textbooks, teaching materials, all met standards unmatched anywhere in tropical Africa."

The Swahili word for school, shule, is derived from the German word Schule.

== Population on the eve of World War I ==
In the most populous colony of the German Empire, there were more than 7.5 million locals. About 30% were Muslim and the remainder belonged to various tribal beliefs or Christian converts, compared to around 10,000 Europeans, who resided mainly in coastal locations and official residences. In 1913, only 882 German farmers and planters lived in the colony. Approximately 70,000 Africans worked on the plantations of GEA.

== World War I ==
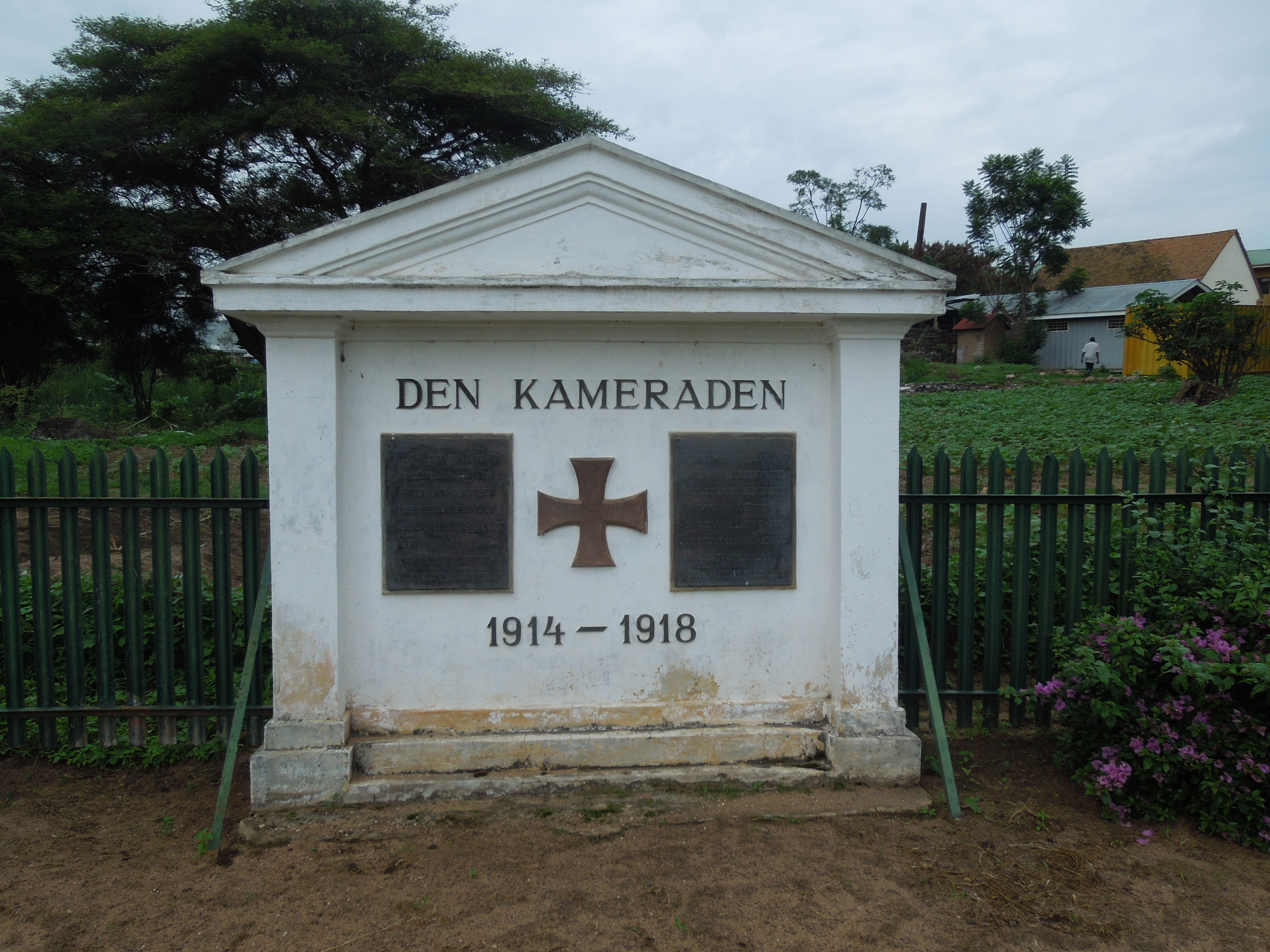
A World War I memorial in Iringa, Tanzania

General Paul von Lettow-Vorbeck had served in German South West Africa and Kamerun. He led the German forces in GEA during World War I. His military force consisted of 3,500 Europeans and 12,000 native Askaris and porters. The war strategy was to harry the British army of 40,000, which was at times commanded by the former Second Boer War commander Jan Smuts. One of Lettow-Vorbeck's greatest victories was at the Battle of Tanga (3–5 November 1914). In the battle, the German forces defeated a British force, which was more than eight times larger.

Lettow-Vorbeck's guerrilla warfare compelled Britain to commit significant resources to a minor colonial theatre throughout the war and inflicted more than 10,000 casualties. Eventually, the weight of numbers, especially after forces coming from the Belgian Congo had attacked from the west (Battle of Tabora), and dwindling supplies forced Lettow-Vorbeck to abandon the colony. He withdrew south into Portuguese Mozambique and then into Northern Rhodesia, where he agreed to a ceasefire after he had received news of the armistice between the warring nations three days earlier.

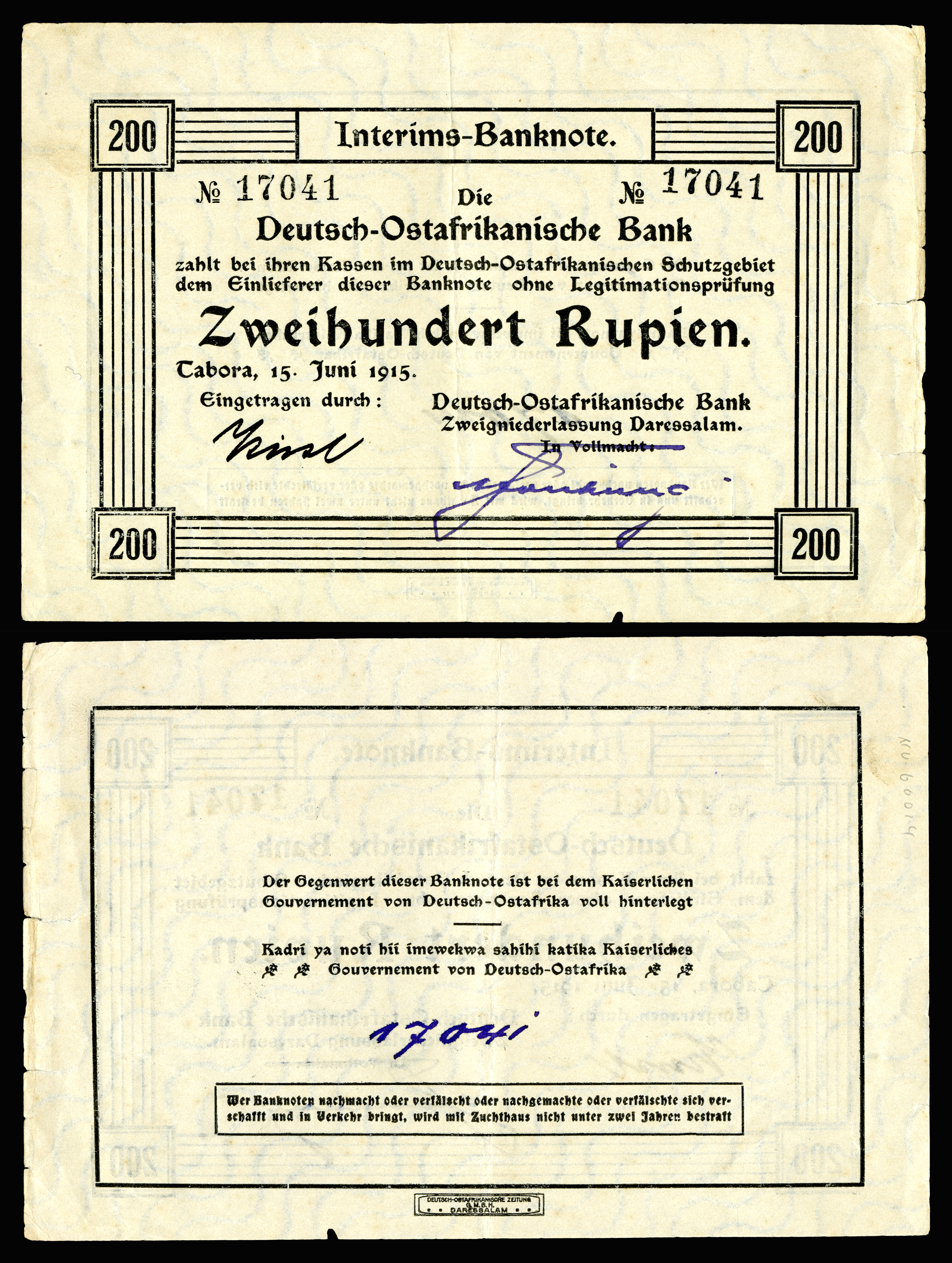
A 200 German East African rupie provisional banknote issued in Tabora in 1915–17

Currency had to be printed locally due to a significant lack of provisions resulting from the naval blockade.

After the war, Lettow-Vorbeck was acclaimed as one of Germany's heroes. His Schutztruppe was celebrated as the only colonial German force during World War I that was not defeated in open combat, but it often retreated when it was outnumbered. The Askari colonial troops who had fought in the East African campaign were later given pension payments by the Weimar Republic and West Germany.

The SMS Königsberg, a German light cruiser, also fought off the coast of the African Great Lakes region. She was eventually scuttled in the Rufiji delta in July 1915 after running low on coal and spare parts and was subsequently blockaded and bombarded by the British. The surviving crew stripped out the remaining ship's guns, mounted them on gun carriages, and joined the land forces, which added considerably to their effectiveness.

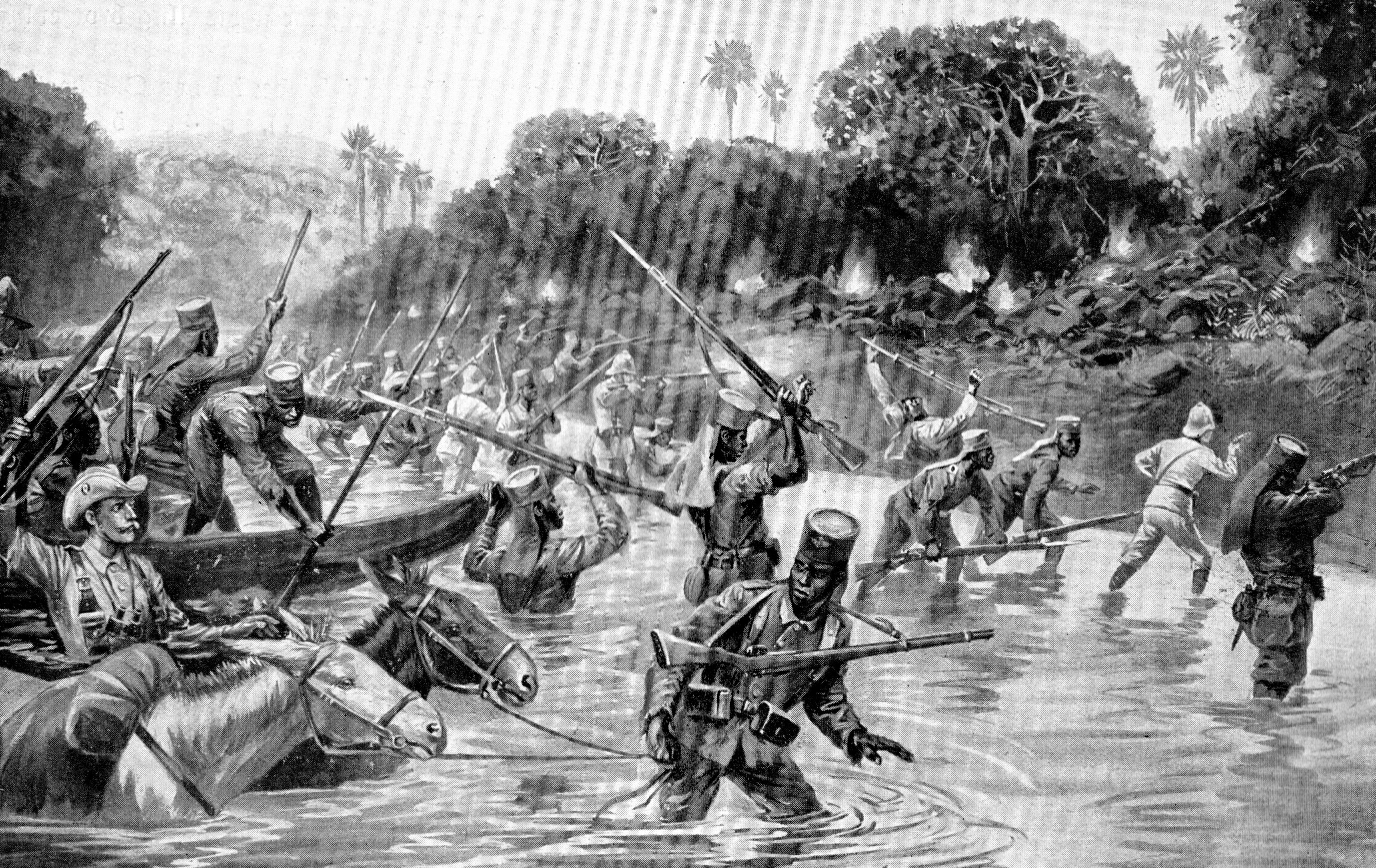
The Portuguese were flanked by the Germans, while encamped at Ngomano on 25 November 1917.

Another smaller campaign was conducted on the shores of southern Lake Tanganyika in 1914 and 1915. It involved a makeshift British and Belgian flotilla and the Reichsheer garrison at Bismarckburg (modern-day Kasanga).

== Break-up of the colony ==
The Supreme Council of the 1919 Paris Peace Conference awarded all of German East Africa (GEA) to Britain on 7 May 1919, over the strenuous objections of Belgium. The British colonial secretary, Alfred Milner, and Belgium's minister plenipotentiary to the conference, Pierre Orts, then negotiated the Anglo-Belgian agreement of 30 May 1919 where Britain ceded the north-western GEA districts of Ruanda and Urundi to Belgium. The conference's Commission on Mandates ratified this agreement on 16 July 1919. The Supreme Council accepted the agreement on 7 August 1919.

On 12 July 1919, the Commission on Mandates agreed that the small Kionga Triangle south of the Rovuma River would be given to Portugal; it eventually became part of independent Mozambique. The commission reasoned that Germany had virtually forced Portugal to cede the triangle in 1894.

The Treaty of Versailles was signed on 28 June 1919, although the treaty did not take effect until 10 January 1920. On that date, the GEA was transferred officially to Britain, Belgium, and Portugal. Also on the same day, "Tanganyika" became the name of the British territory.

== German placenames ==
Some names in German East Africa continued to bear German spellings of the local names for a while, such as "Udjidji" for Ujiji and "Kilimandscharo" for Mount Kilimanjaro, "Kleinaruscha" for Arusha-Chini and "Neu-Moschi" for the city now known as Moshi. (Kigoma was known for a time as "Rutschugi".)

Many places were given African names or had their previous names reestablished:

- Alt Langenburg (Ikombe)
- Bergfrieden (Mibirizi)
- Bismarckburg (Kasanga) on the south-eastern end of Lake Tanganyika
- Emmaberg (Ilembule)
- Fischerstadt (Rombo)
- Friedberg (Nyakanazi)
- Gottorp or Neu-Gottorp (Uvinza) near the northeastern end of Lake Tanganyika
- Hohenfriedeberg (Mlalo)
- Hoffnungshöh (Kisarawe)
- Kaiseraue (Kazimzumbwi)
- Kirondathal (Kirondatal) gold mine
- Langenburg and Neu-Langenburg (Tukuyu) north of Lake Nyasa
- Leudorf (Liganga)
- Mariahilf (Igulwa)
- Marienthal (Ushetu)
- Neu-Bethel (Mnazi)
- Neu-Bonn (Mikese)
- Neu-Hornow (Shume) in the Pare Mountains in the northeast
- Neu-Langenburg (Lumbira)
- Neu-Trier (Mbulu)
- Peterswerft (Nansio)
- Sachsenwald (Sekenke) gold mine
- St. Moritz (Galula)
- Sphinxhafen (Liuli) on the eastern shore of Lake Nyasa
- Wiedhafen (Manda) on the eastern shore of Lake Nyasa
- Wilhelmstal or Wilhelmsdorf (Lushoto) on the Pangani River in the northeast
- Wißmannhafen, port of Bismarckburg (Kasanga) on the southeastern end of Lake Tanganyika

== List of governors ==
The Imperial High Commissioners (German: Reichskommissar) and Imperial Governors (German: Kaiserlicher Gouverneur) of German East Africa:

=== Reichskommissar (1885/1888–1891) ===
- 1888–1891: Hermann Wissmann
  - Carl Peters, as sometimes claimed, was never Reichskommissar for German East Africa, but administrator from 27 May 1885 to 8 February 1888. On 18 March 1891, Dr. Peters was named "Reichskommissar for the Kilimanjaro Region" in Moshi, however subordinate to governor Freiherr von Soden. In 1892, he was recalled and returned to Germany. After three investigations, in 1897, he was officially deprived of his commission with the loss of his title and his pension rights. However, in 1905 Kaiser Wilhelm II awarded him the title of "retired Reichskommissar" and from 1914 he also received an annual pension.

=== Imperial Governors (1891–1918) ===
- 1891–1893: Julius von Soden
- 1893–1895: Friedrich von Schele
- 1895–1896: Hermann Wissmann
- 1896–1901: Eduard von Liebert
- 1901–1906: Gustav Adolf von Götzen
- 1906–1912: Albrecht von Rechenberg
- 1912–1918: Heinrich Schnee

== Archived records ==
The administration of German East Africa from 1884 to 1917 is documented in a set of records now held by the Tanzania National Archives. In 1997, these German records were inscribed by UNESCO in its Memory of the World International Register, recognising them as documents of global importance.

== Maps ==
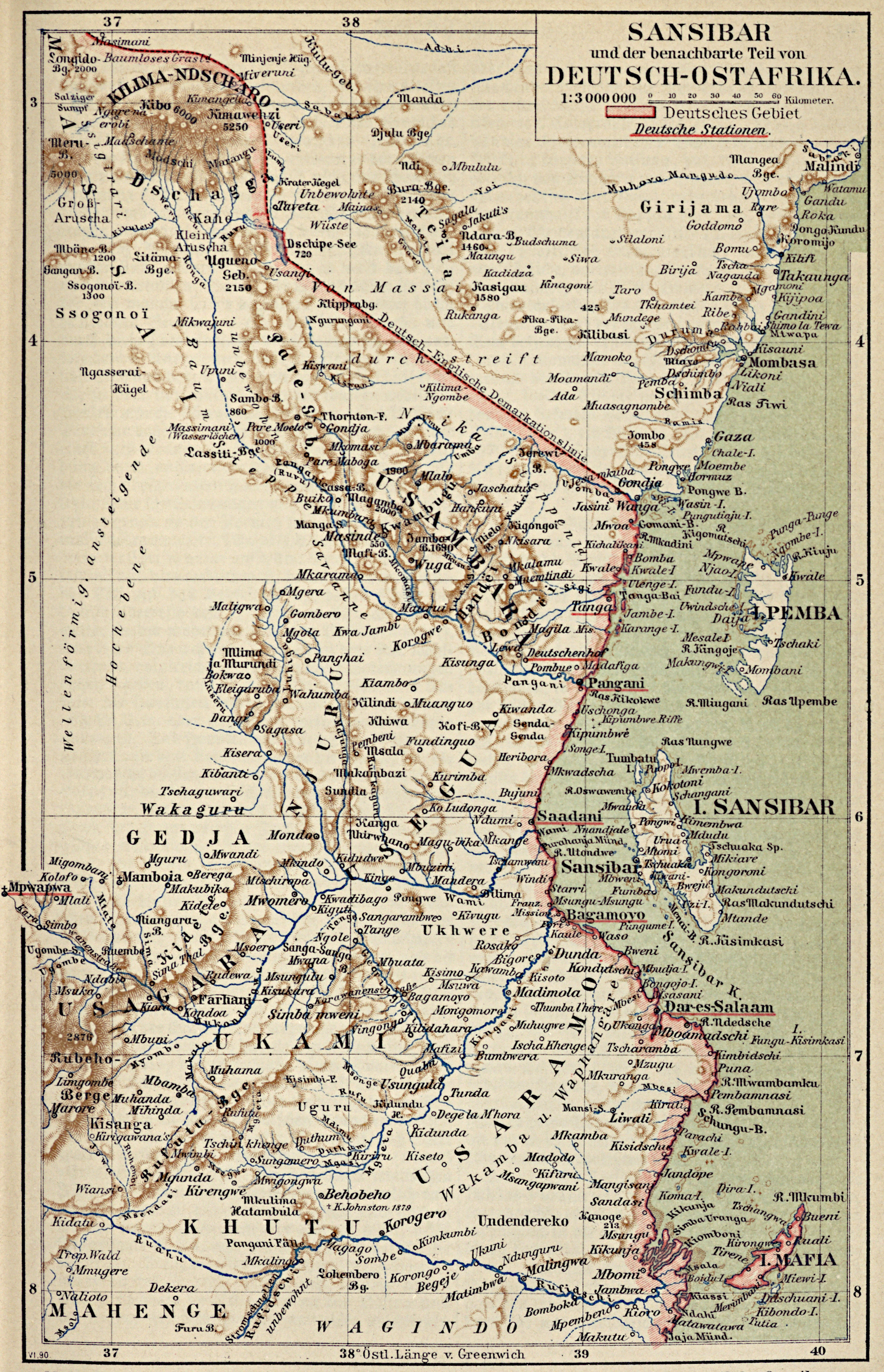
Historical map of the German East African coast, 1890

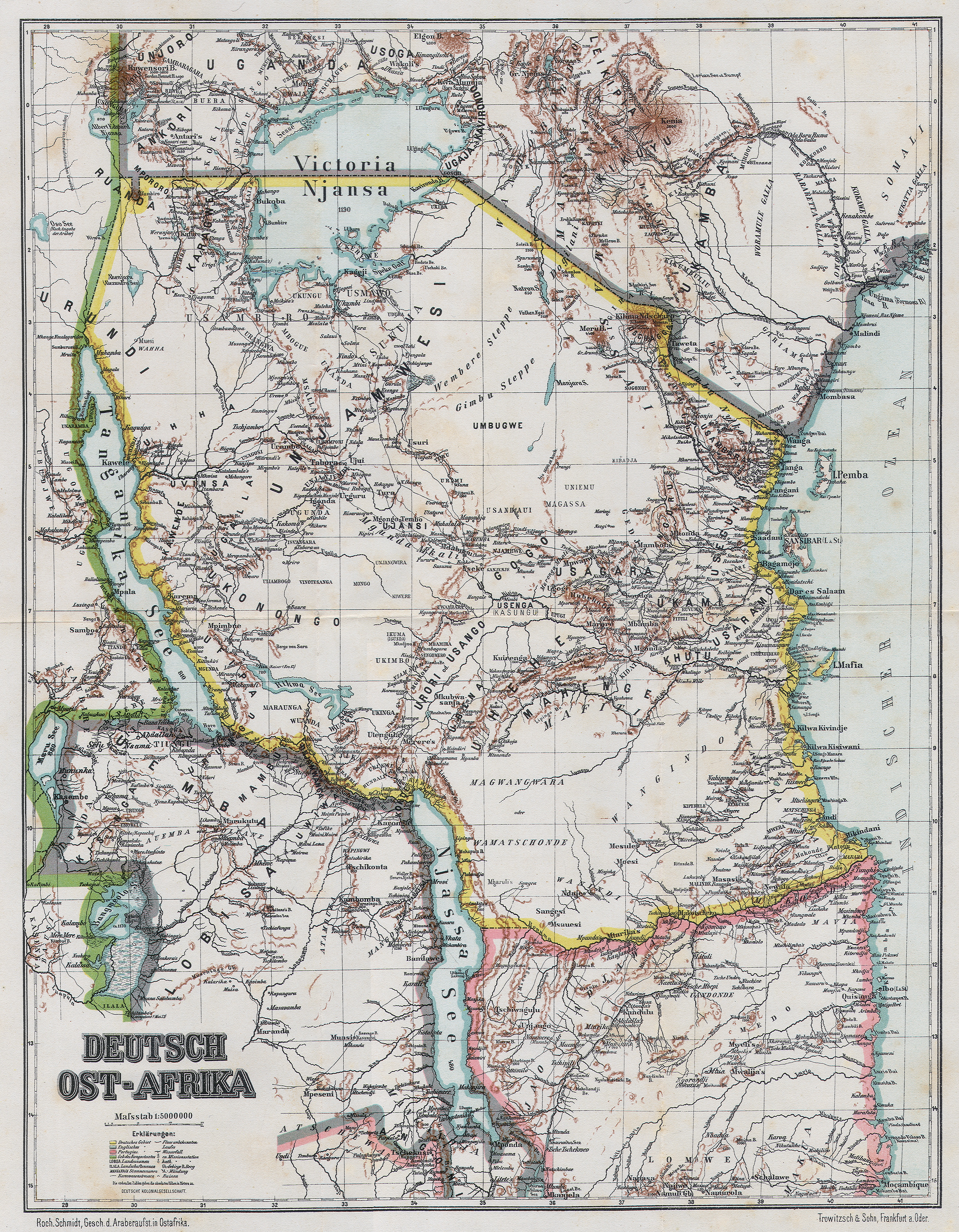
Historical map of German East Africa, 1892

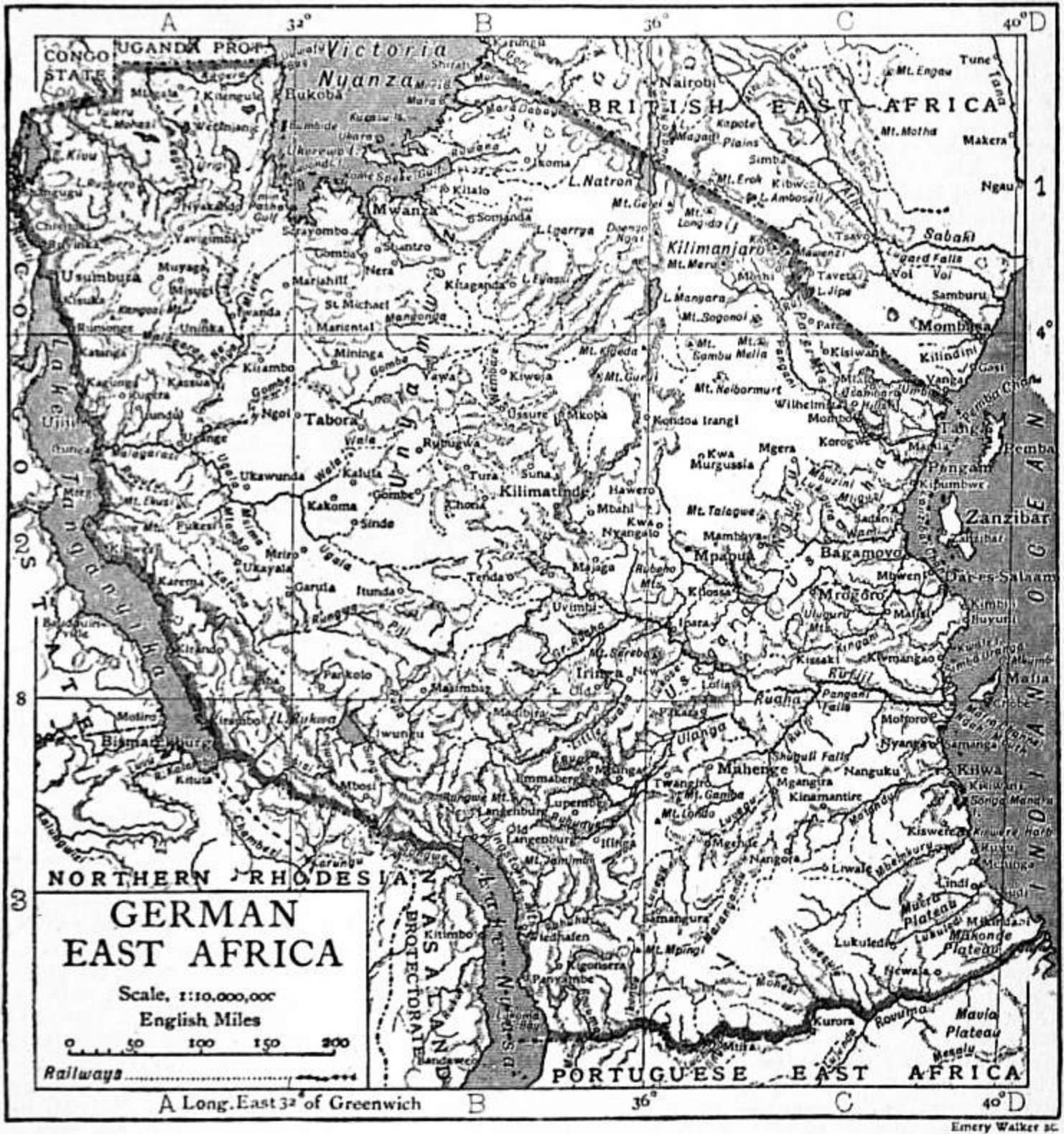
Historical map of German East Africa, 1911

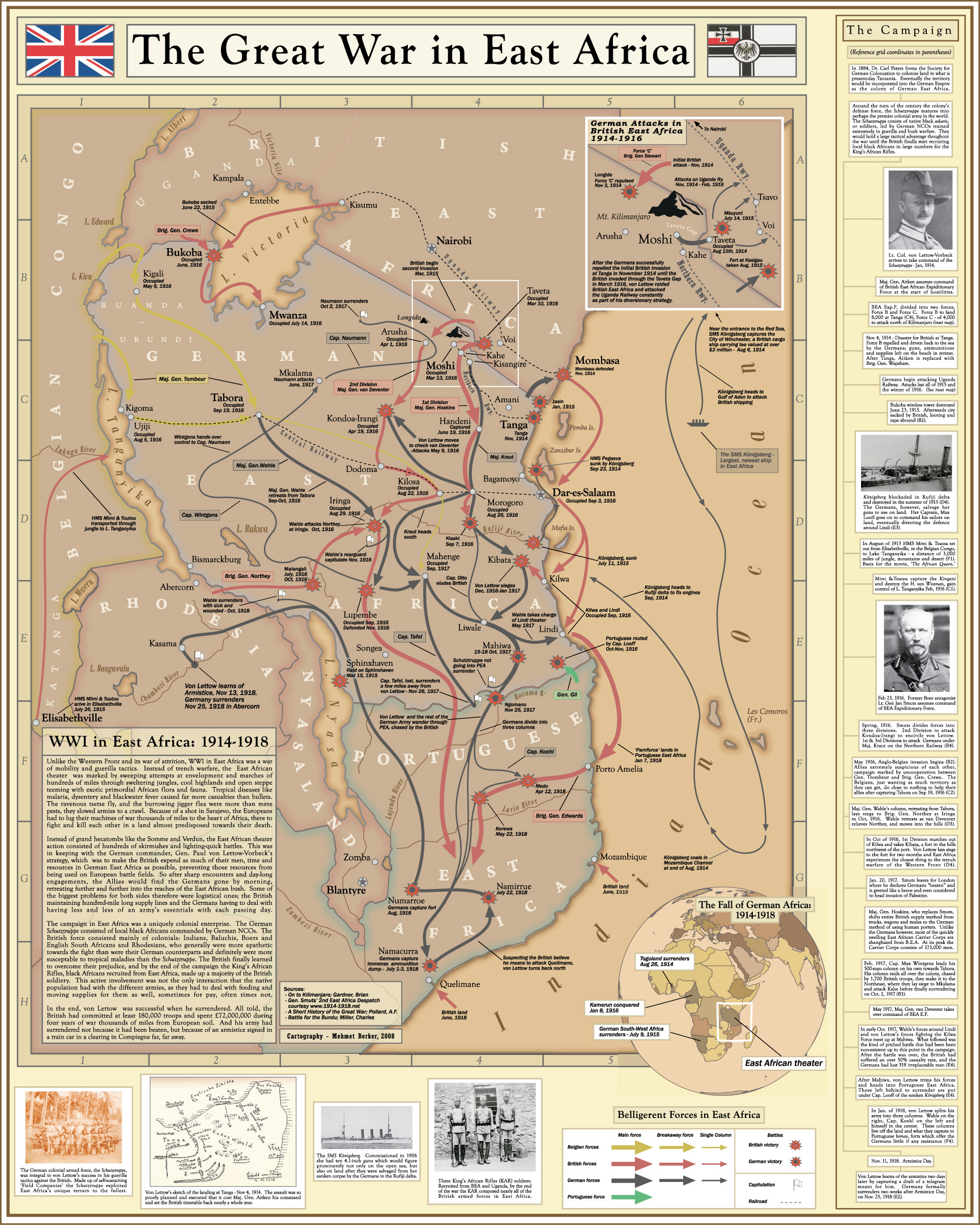
Map of the East African Theater in World War I

== Gallery ==
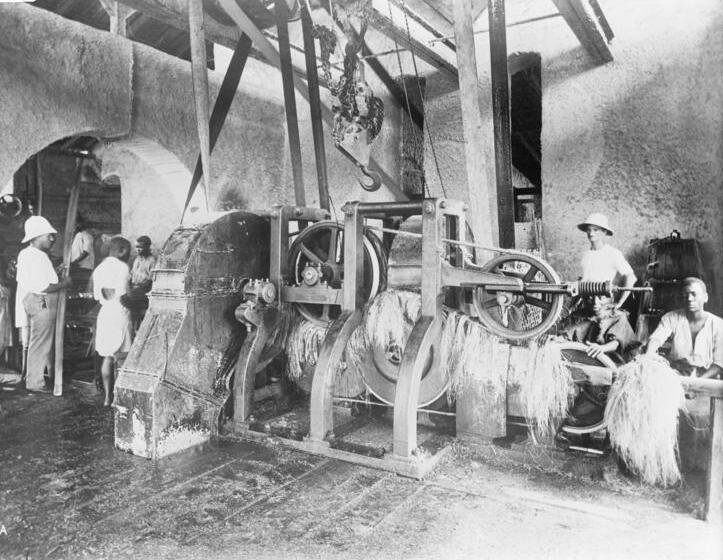
Sisal factory, c. 1906/18

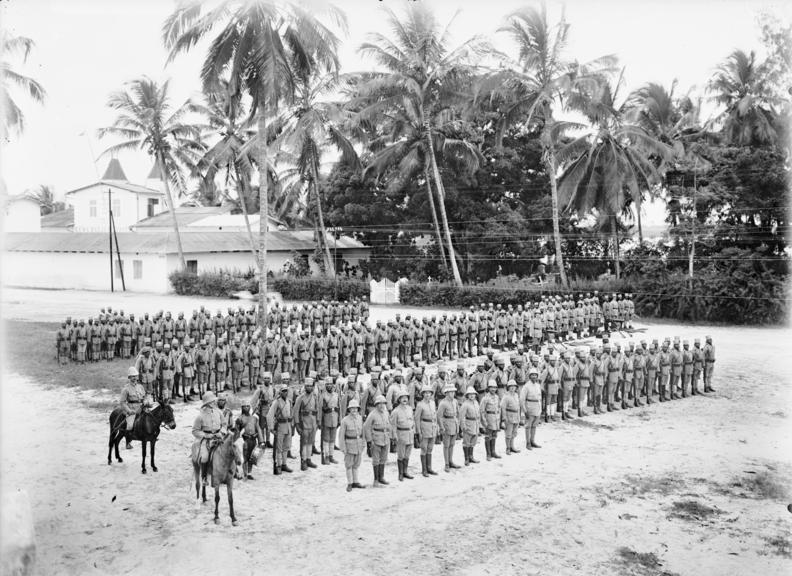
Askari company, c. 1914/18

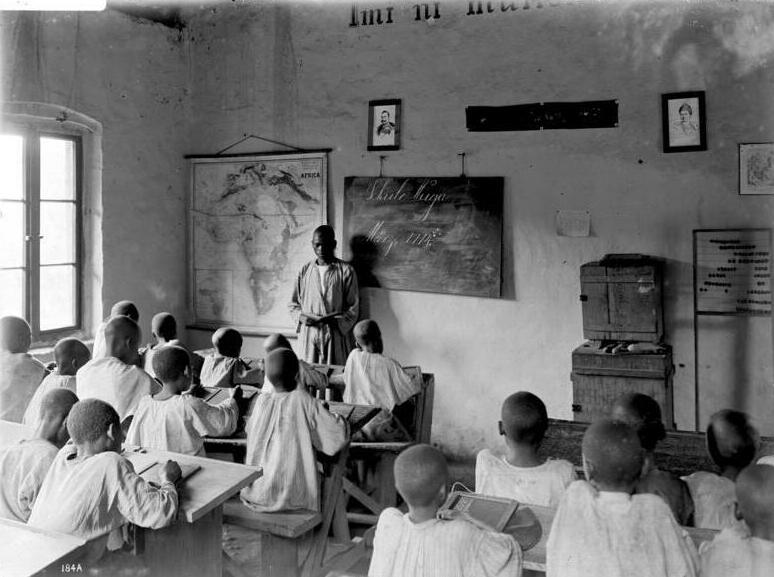
Classroom in a German East African school, c. March 1914

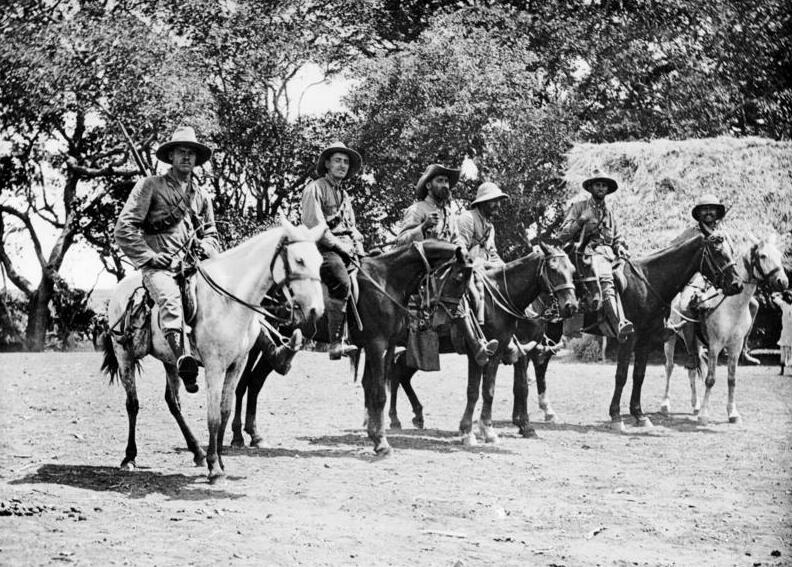
German colonial volunteer mounted patrol, 1914

== Planned symbols for German East Africa ==
In 1914, a series of drafts were made for proposed coats of arms and flags for the German colonies. However, World War I broke out before the designs were finished and implemented, and the symbols were never actually used. Following its defeat in the war, Germany lost all its colonies and the prepared coats of arms and flags as a result were never used.

Proposed flag

Proposed coat of arms

== See also ==
- List of governors of Tanganyika
- List of former German colonies
- Ada Schnee
- Chambeshi Monument
