= Emil von Zelewski =

German officer (1854–1891)

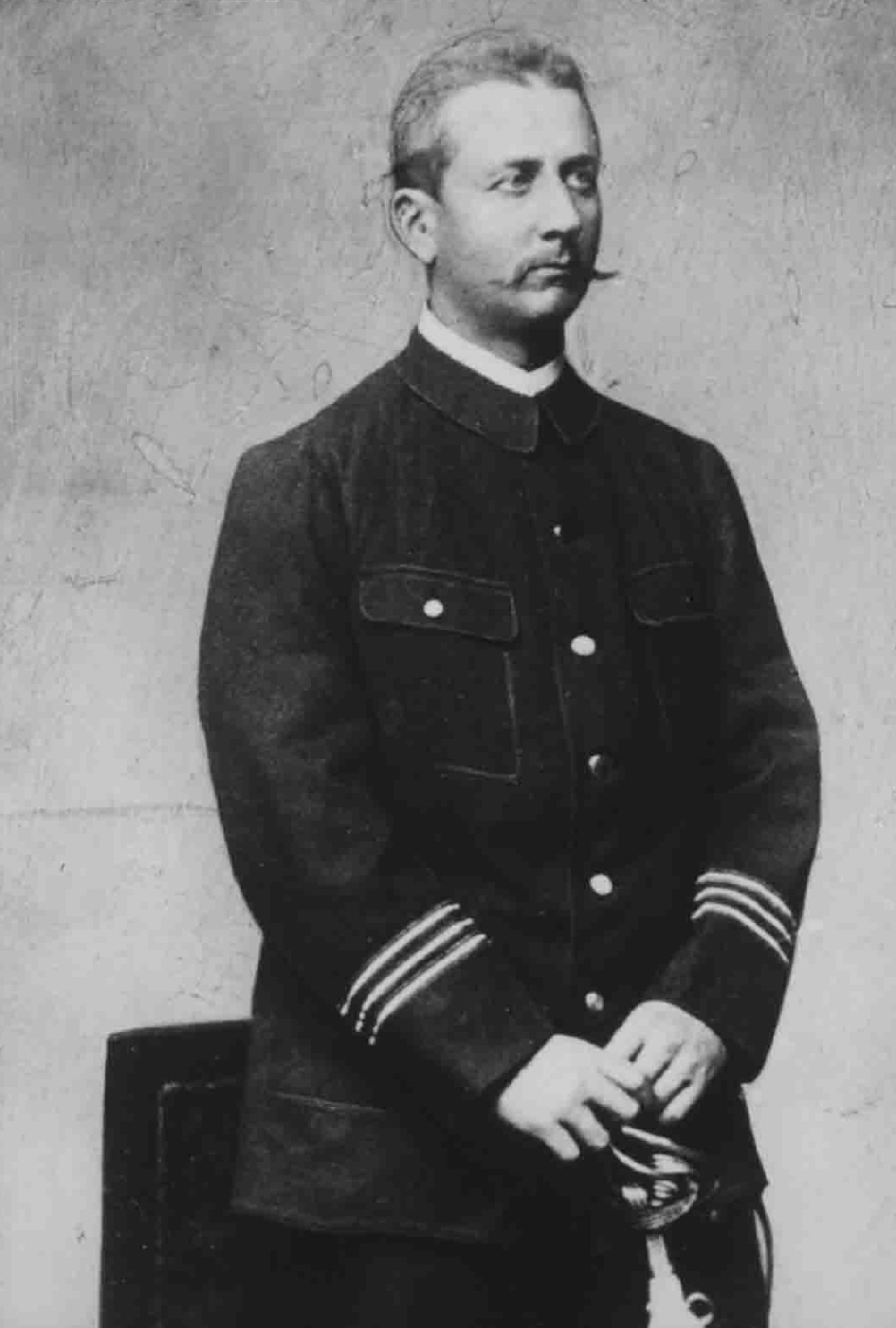
- Born: 13 March 1854; Bendargau, Pomerania, Prussia
- Died: 17 August 1891 (aged 37); Lugalo, German East Africa
- Military career
- Allegiance: German Empire: German East Africa Company
- Branch: Imperial German Army: (German East Africa) Schutztruppe
- Service years: 1881–1891
- Rank: Hauptmann
- Units: 99th (2nd Upper Rhenish) Infantry Regiment; Schutztruppe for German East Africa
- Conflicts: Abushiri Revolt; Hehe Revolt: Battle of Lugalo †

Emil von Zelewski (13 March 1854 – 17 August 1891) was a German military officer who served as commander of the Schutztruppe in German East Africa. He led German forces against an uprising by the Hehe people, and was killed at the Battle of Lugalo.

== Early years ==
Emil von Zelewski was born in Bendargau in the Pomeranian district of Neustadt. He joined the Prussian Army and served in the 99th Infantry Regiment at Posen in 1881.

== Service in the German East Africa Company ==
In 1886 he retired from the Imperial German Army as a first lieutenant and entered the service of the German East Africa Company (GEAC). In August 1888 he was sent to the city of Pangani, which belonged to the Sultanate of Zanzibar, as a representative of the company. During the meeting, Zelewski's imperious behavior became a trigger for the uprising of the East African coastal population against the GEAC.

The company had concluded a coastal and customs treaty with the Sultan in 1887. In return for an annual lease, it took over the administration of the mainland strip of Zanzibar and levied customs duties. When the GEAC tried to take over the administration of the coastal towns in August 1888, it met with broad rejection from the population, who saw themselves betrayed by the sultan.

== Abushiri Revolt ==
Zelewski's imperious behavior towards the Sultan's local wali and the disregard for the Sultan's flag when the GEAC flag was raised led to open outrage. The Austrian Consul Rudolf Fuchs in Zanzibar then reported to his Foreign Minister in Vienna,

... that the official of the German East African Society made the mistake of following the Wali von Pangani in a mosque, which buildings in this country are not allowed to be entered by non-Muslims the unfortunate circumstance occurred that the officers' dogs ran after him to the mosque - this whole incident is officially denied by the German side, but was confirmed to me by an eyewitness - ... an Austrian citizen in confidence as correct.

This incident also took place on the Eid al-Adha which was one of the most important Islamic holidays.

The unrest in Pangani triggered the two-year uprising of the coastal population led by Buschiri bin Salim, in which the rule of the GEAC completely collapsed. The German Empire deployed marine infantry from ships of the Imperial German Navy in the Indian Ocean and sent Hermann Wissmann as Reichskommissar of German East Africa, who was to put down the insurrection movement with a hastily recruited force of German officers and African mercenaries. The control of the protected area was then transferred from the GEAC to the German Empire.

Emil von Zelewski joined Wissmann's troops in 1889, took part in the storming of Buschiri's camp and the capture of Pangani and Saadani. He was eventually appointed head of the Wissmann Troop in Kilwa. During the capture of Pangani, Zelewski and his men committed numerous atrocities. They took away men from manual labour, raped women, and shot anyone who resisted.

== Commander of the Protection Force ==
On 1 April 1891 he succeeded Wissmann as commander in German East Africa. By Imperial law of 22 March 1891 the Schutztruppe for German East Africa was established as a military force under Imperial control and Wissmann's private group was integrated into it.

After conquering the coast, the Germans tried to consolidate their power inland as well. To do this, it was primarily necessary to secure the caravan routes between the coast and Ujiji on Lake Tanganyika. They roughly correspond to the line on which the Mittellandbahn was later built.

In this area, the German colonial power encountered the expanding sphere of influence of the Hehe people, who had brought large parts of the southern highlands under their control under their chiefs Munyigumba Muyinga and Mkwawa since the 1860s. The Hehe trains extended into the area of the caravan route. There were also attacks on tribes that had recognized German supremacy. That is why the decision was made in the new capital Dar es Salaam to undertake a punitive expedition against the Hehe.

== Death in Lugalo ==
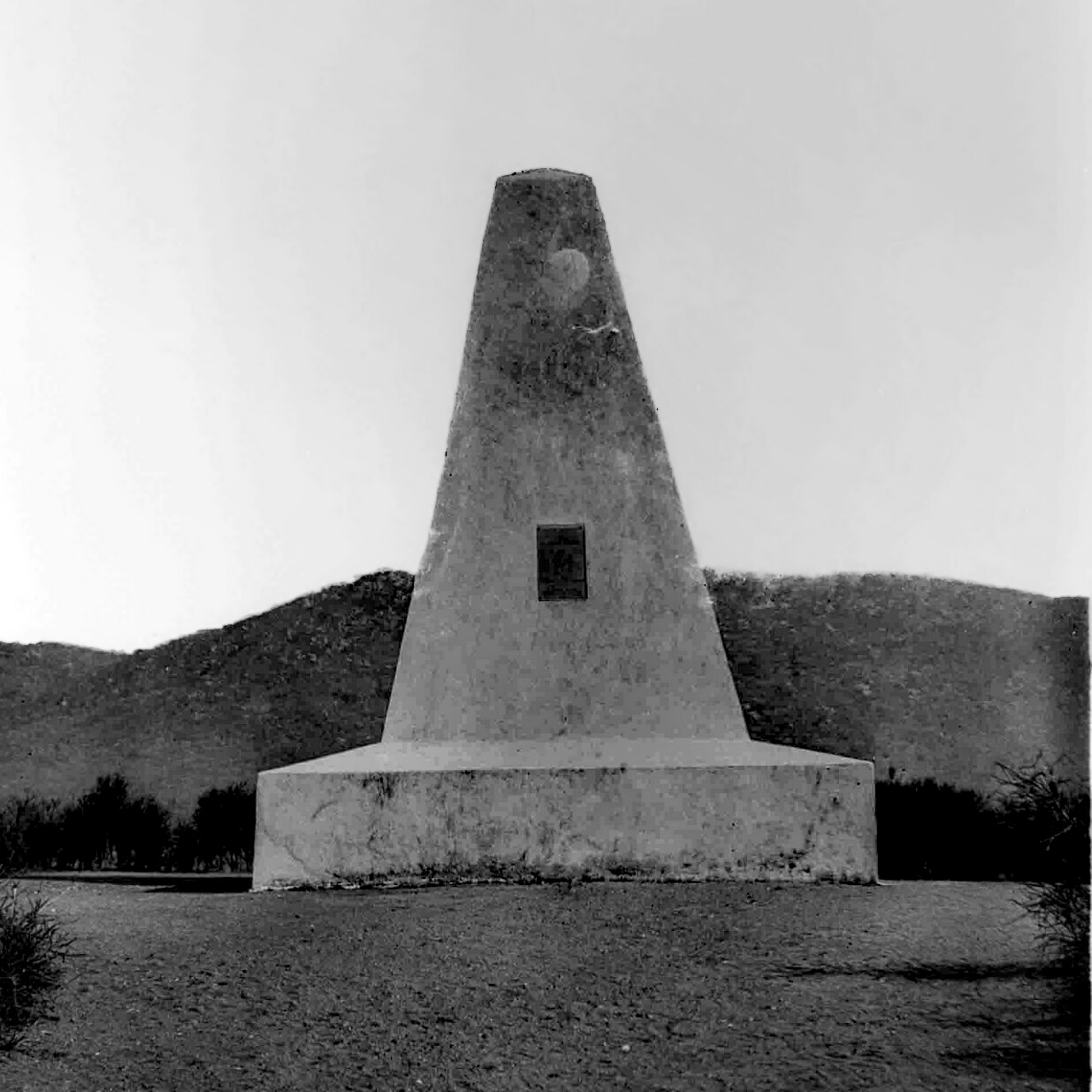
The Zelewski monument near Lugaro

The first significant action by Zelewski as commander was also his last. In July 1891 he marched with a battalion of the Schutztruppe (three companies with 13 officers, 320 Askaris, 170 porters as well as machine guns and light field guns) from the East African coast towards Heheland.

Zelewski switched to scorched earth warfare as he knew it from fighting the coastal insurrection. On 30 July 1891 he noted “a fortified settlement shot at with 20 shells and 850 Maxim cartridges”, on 5 and 6 August 1891, 25 farms burned down, and on 15 and 16 August 1891 another 50 farms.

Mkwawa and his brother Mpangie had gathered their warriors and were waiting for the Schutztruppe to ambush them. On 17 August 1891 Zelewski, who renounced reconnaissance patrols, marched right into the middle of Mkwawa's army; camouflaged in bush and tall grass. Near Rugaro he was attacked by up to 3,000 Hehe. Zelewski and most of his men were dead within ten minutes. Two German lieutenants and two NCOs managed to escape with two Effendis, 62 Askaris, 74 porters, four donkeys and some of the luggage.

A few years later, a small pyramid with a memorial plaque for the German fallen soldiers was erected at the site of the battle.

== Family ==
A nephew of Emil von Zelewski was Erich von dem Bach-Zelewski, who, as a SS-Obergruppenführer, was involved in anti-partisan operations and was significantly involved in extermination campaigns in the Soviet Union. In August 1944 he ordered the suppression of the Warsaw Uprising. His biographer Blood takes the view that the uncle's fate was seen as a family disgrace because he was defeated in a fight against "inferior" Africans. This was one of the driving forces behind the atrocities to which the nephew felt were called for.
