= Kwamndolwa =

Ward in Korogwe Town District, Tanga Region

Kwamndolwa Kata ya Kwamndolwa (Swahili)
- Ward
- Kata ya Kwamndolwa, Wilaya ya Korogwe Mjini
- Location within Tanzania
- Country: Tanzania
- Region: Tanga Region
- District: Korogwe Urban District

Area
  - Total: 43.2 km^{2} (16.7 sq mi)
- Elevation: 320 m (1,050 ft)

Population (2012)
  - Total: 5,160
  - Density: 119/km^{2} (309/sq mi)

Ethnic groups
  - Settler: Swahili
  - Ancestral: Shambaa
- Tanzanian Postal Code: 21607

Kwamndolwa is an administrative ward in Korogwe Urban District of Tanga Region in Tanzania. The ward covers an area of 43.2 km^{2} (16.7 sq mi), and has an average elevation of 297 m (974 ft). According to the 2012 census, the ward has a total population of 5,160.
