= Magunga, Tanga =

Ward in Korogwe Town District, Tanga Region

Magunga Kata ya Magunga (Swahili)
- Ward
- Kata ya Magunga, Wilaya ya Korogwe Mjini
- Location within Tanzania
- Country: Tanzania
- Region: Tanga Region
- District: Korogwe Urban District

Area
  - Total: 8.5 km^{2} (3.3 sq mi)
- Elevation: 326 m (1,070 ft)

Population (2012)
  - Total: 9,519
  - Density: 1,100/km^{2} (2,900/sq mi)

Ethnic groups
  - Settler: Swahili
  - Ancestral: Shambaa

Magunga is an administrative ward in Korogwe Urban District of Tanga Region in Tanzania. The ward covers an area of 8.5 km^{2} (3.3 sq mi), and has an average elevation of 326 m (1,070 ft). According to the 2012 census, the ward has a total population of 9,519.
