= Mtonga =

Ward in Korogwe Town District, Tanga Region

Mtonga Kata ya Mtonga (Swahili)
- Ward
- Kata ya Mtonga, Wilaya ya Korogwe Mjini
- Location within Tanzania
- Country: Tanzania
- Region: Tanga Region
- District: Korogwe Urban District

Area
  - Total: 14.8 km^{2} (5.7 sq mi)
- Elevation: 334 m (1,096 ft)

Population (2012)
  - Total: 10,369
  - Density: 701/km^{2} (1,810/sq mi)

Ethnic groups
  - Settler: Swahili
  - Ancestral: Shambaa
- Tanzanian Postal Code: 21606

Mtonga is an administrative ward in Korogwe Urban District of Tanga Region in Tanzania. The ward covers an area of 14.8 km^{2} (5.7 sq mi), and has an average elevation of 334 m (1,096 ft). According to the 2012 census, the ward has a total population of 10,369.
