= Manundu =

Ward in Korogwe Town District, Tanga Region

Manundu Kata ya Manundu (Swahili)
- Ward
- Kata ya Manundu, Wilaya ya Korogwe Mjini
- Location within Tanzania
- Country: Tanzania
- Region: Tanga Region
- District: Korogwe Urban District

Area
  - Total: 4.5 km^{2} (1.7 sq mi)
- Elevation: 328 m (1,076 ft)

Population (2012)
  - Total: 17,499
  - Density: 3,900/km^{2} (10,000/sq mi)

Ethnic groups
  - Settler: Swahili
  - Ancestral: Shambaa
- Tanzanian Postal Code: 21601

Manundu is an administrative ward in Korogwe Urban District of Tanga Region in Tanzania. The ward covers an area of 4.5 km^{2} (1.7 sq mi), and has an average elevation of 328 m (1,076 ft). According to the 2012 census, the ward has a total population of 17,499.
