= Old Korogwe =

Ward in Korogwe Town District, Tanga Region

Old Korogwe Kata ya Old Korogwe (Swahili)
- Ward
- Kata ya Old Korogwe, Wilaya ya Korogwe Mjini
- Location within Tanzania
- Country: Tanzania
- Region: Tanga Region
- District: Korogwe Urban District

Area
  - Total: 26.7 km^{2} (10.3 sq mi)
- Elevation: 314 m (1,030 ft)

Population (2012)
  - Total: 6,394
  - Density: 239/km^{2} (620/sq mi)

Ethnic groups
  - Settler: Swahili
  - Ancestral: Shambaa
- Tanzanian Postal Code: 21602

Old Korogwe is an administrative ward in Korogwe Urban District of Tanga Region in Tanzania. The ward covers an area of 26.7 km^{2} (10.3 sq mi), and has an average elevation of 314 m (1,030 ft). According to the 2012 census, the ward has a total population of 6,394.
