= Ngombezi =

Ward in Korogwe Town District, Tanga Region

Ngombezi Kata ya Ngombezi (Swahili)
- Ward
- Kata ya Ngombezi, Wilaya ya Korogwe Mjini
- Location within Tanzania
- Country: Tanzania
- Region: Tanga Region
- District: Korogwe Urban District

Area
  - Total: 34.2 km^{2} (13.2 sq mi)
- Elevation: 366 m (1,201 ft)

Population (2012)
  - Total: 5,346
  - Density: 156/km^{2} (405/sq mi)

Ethnic groups
  - Settler: Swahili
  - Ancestral: Shambaa
- Tanzanian Postal Code: 21606

Ngombezi is an administrative ward in Korogwe Urban District of Tanga Region in Tanzania. The ward covers an area of 34.2 km^{2} (13.2 sq mi), and has an average elevation of 366 m (1,201 ft). According to the 2012 census, the ward has a total population of 5,346.
