= Kilole, Tanga =

Ward in Korogwe Town District, Tanga Region

Kilole Kata ya Kilole (Swahili)
- Ward
- Kata ya Kilole, Wilaya ya Korogwe Mjini
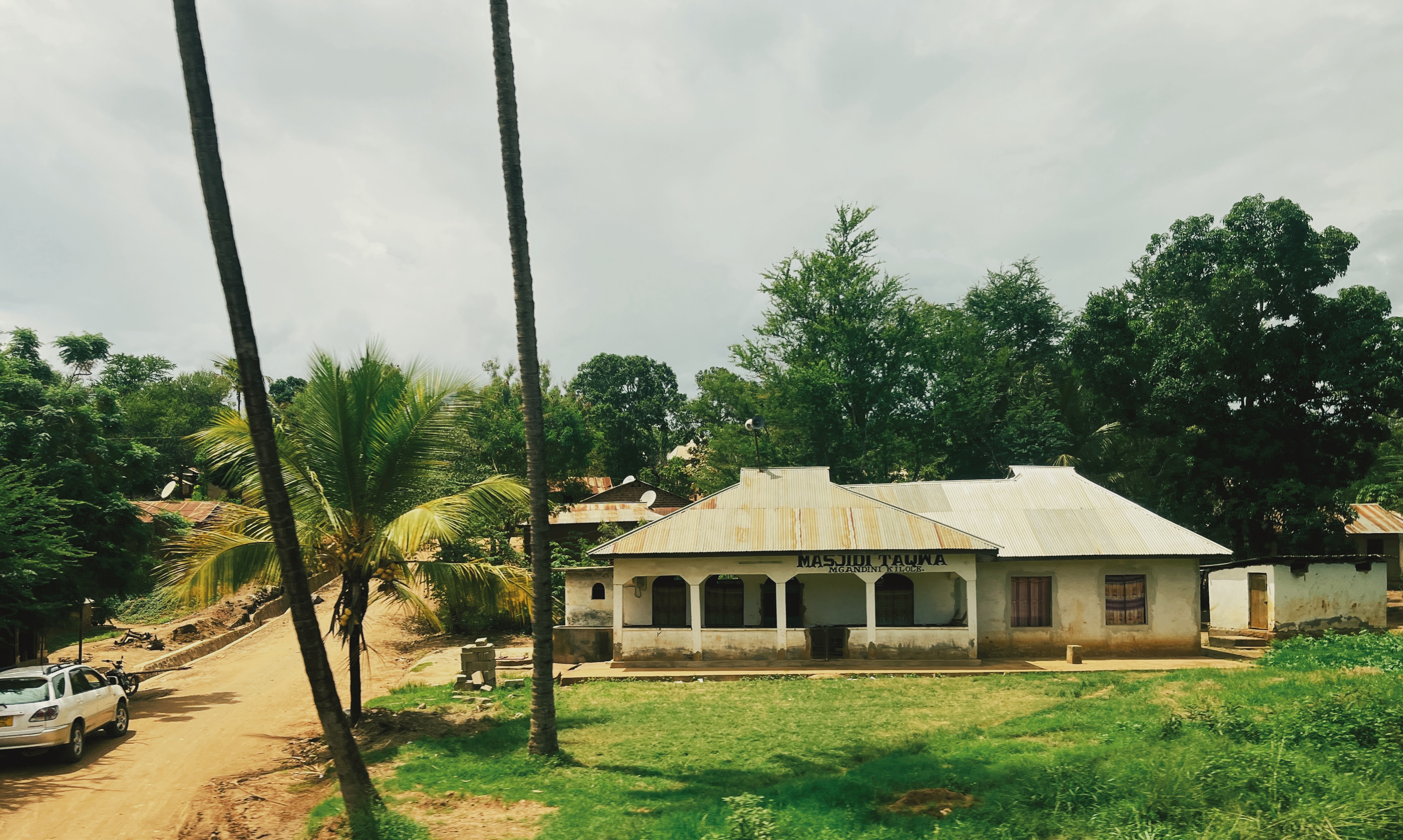
- Kilole Ward, Korogwe Town

- Location within Tanzania
- Country: Tanzania
- Region: Tanga Region
- District: Korogwe Urban District

Area
  - Total: 31.6 km^{2} (12.2 sq mi)
- Elevation: 320 m (1,050 ft)

Population (2012)
  - Total: 8,208
  - Density: 260/km^{2} (673/sq mi)

Ethnic groups
  - Settler: Swahili
  - Ancestral: Shambaa

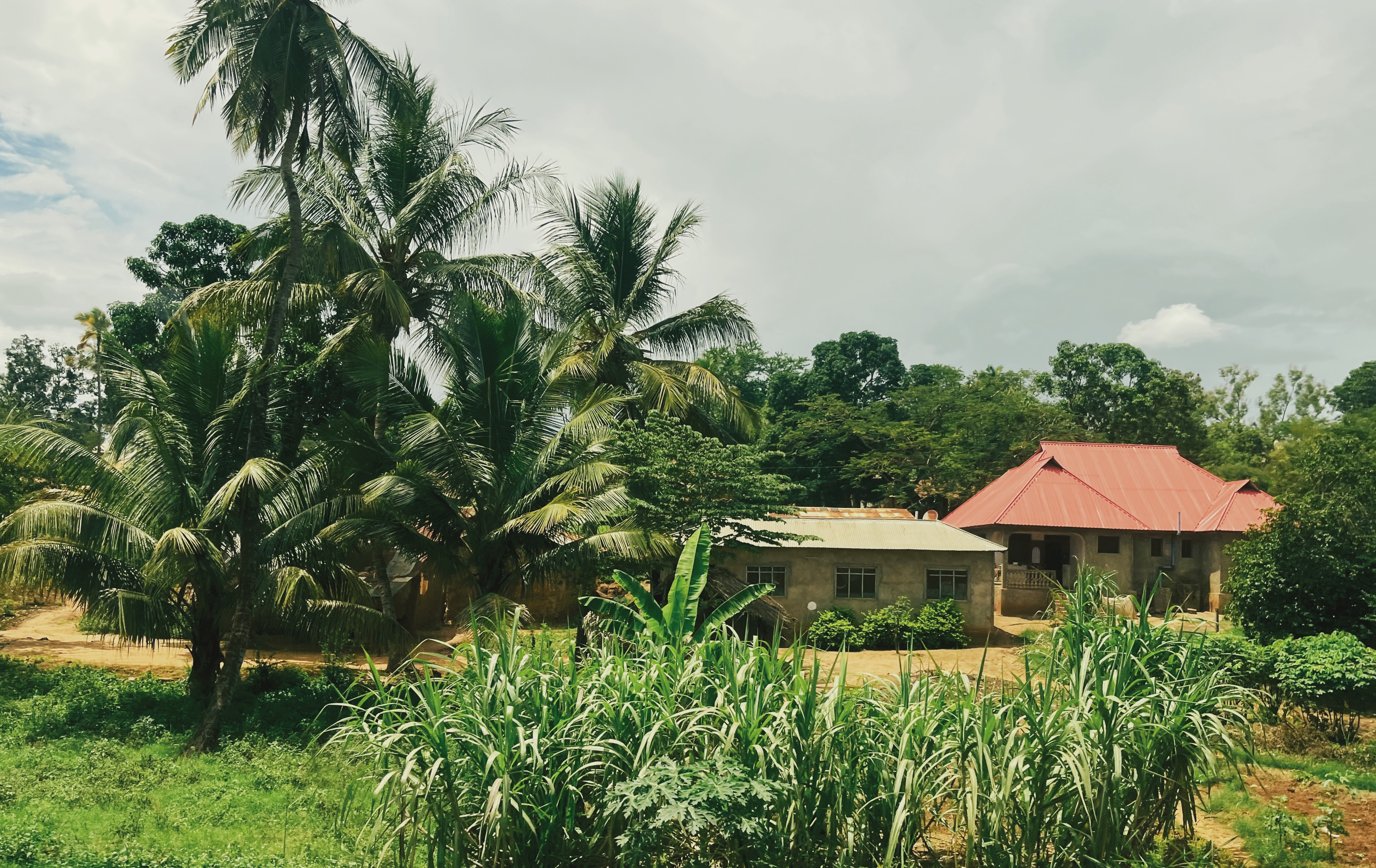
Streetview of Kilole Ward, Korogwe Town

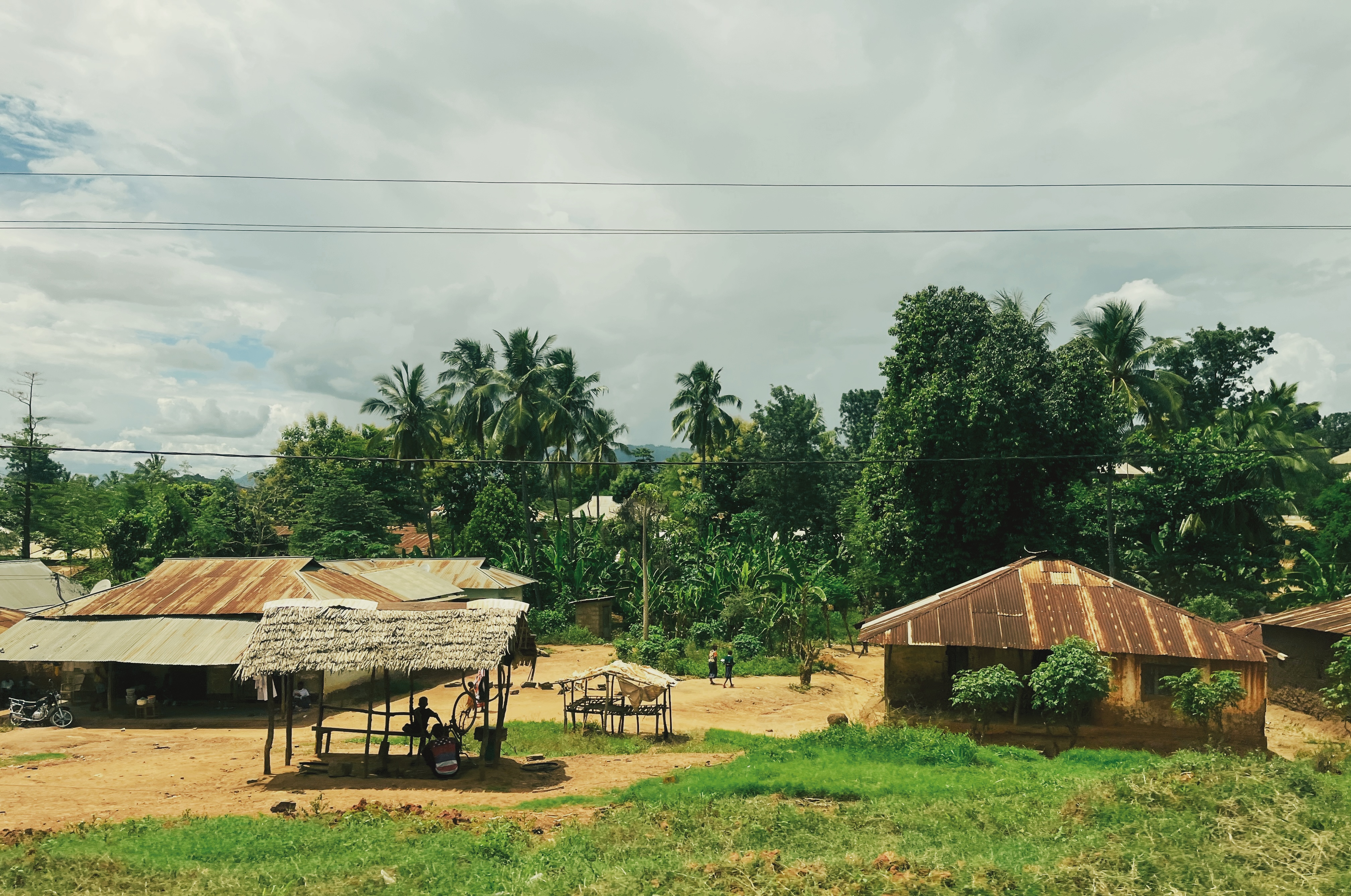
Kilole Ward, Korogwe Town

Kilole is an administrative ward in Korogwe Urban District of Tanga Region in Tanzania. The ward covers an area of 83.5 km^{2} (32.2 sq mi), and has an average elevation of 320 m (1,050 ft). According to the 2012 census the ward has a total population of 8,208.
