= Kwamsisi =

Ward in Korogwe Town District, Tanga Region

Kwamsisi Kata ya Kwamsisi (Swahili)
- Ward
- Kata ya Kwamsisi, Wilaya ya Korogwe Mjini
- Location within Tanzania
- Country: Tanzania
- Region: Tanga Region
- District: Korogwe Urban District

Area
  - Total: 61.5 km^{2} (23.7 sq mi)
- Elevation: 323 m (1,060 ft)

Population (2012)
  - Total: 5,813
  - Density: 94.5/km^{2} (245/sq mi)

Ethnic groups
  - Settler: Swahili
  - Ancestral: Shambaa

Kwamsisi is an administrative ward in Korogwe Urban District of Tanga Region in Tanzania. The ward covers an area of 61.5 km^{2} (23.7 sq mi), and has an average elevation of 323 m (1,060 ft). According to the 2012 census, the ward has a total population of 5,813.
