= Hans Meyer (geographer) =

German scientist and mountaineer

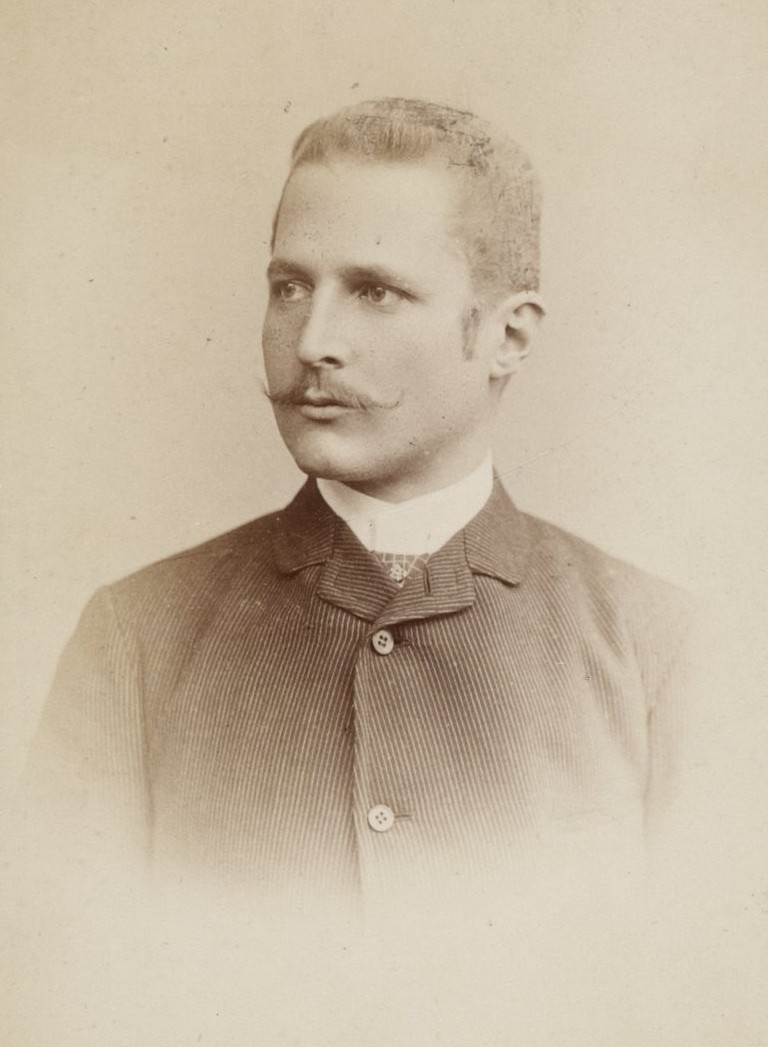
Hans Meyer

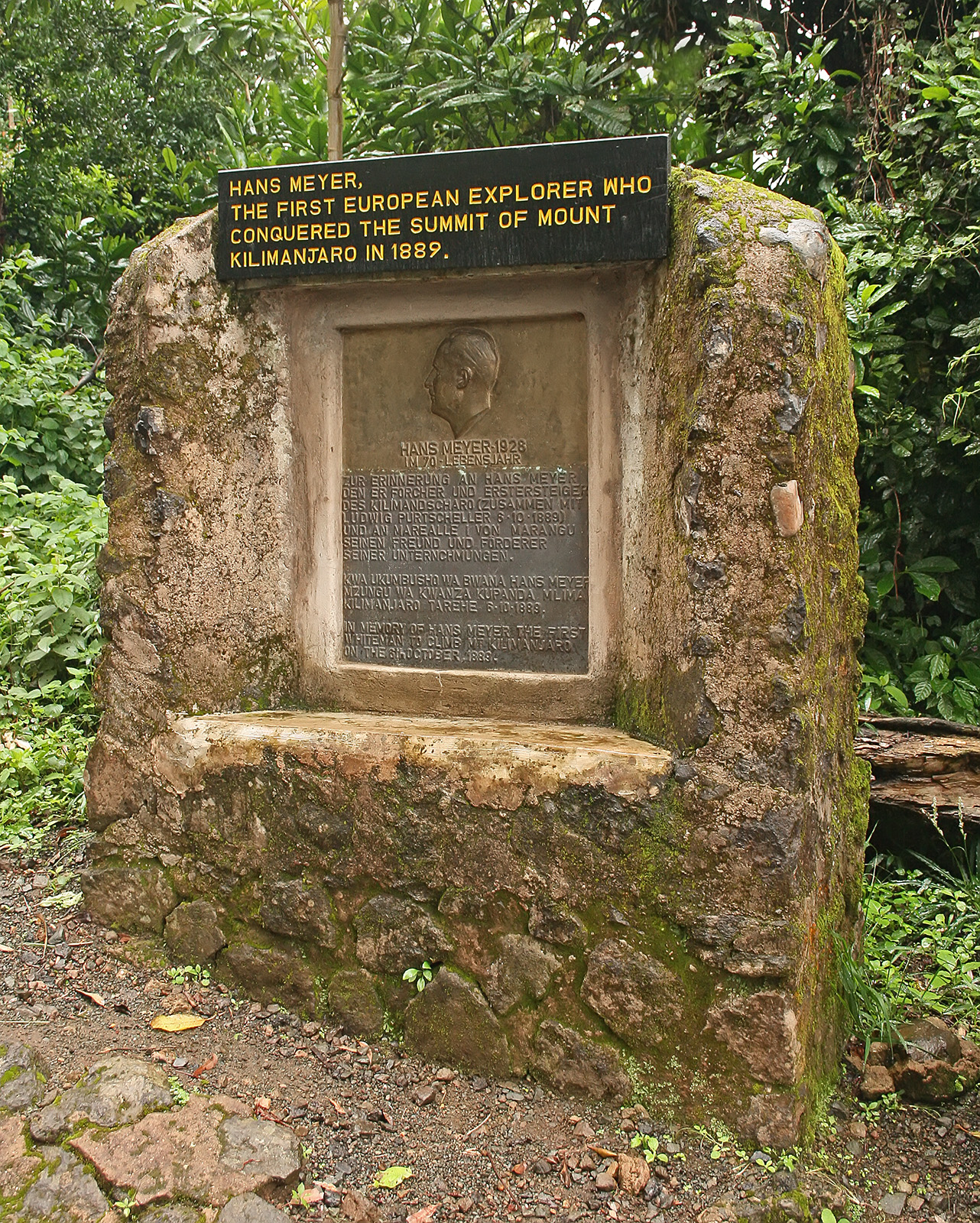
Memorial recognizing Meyer's ascent of Mount Kilimanjaro in Kilimanjaro National Park, Tanzania

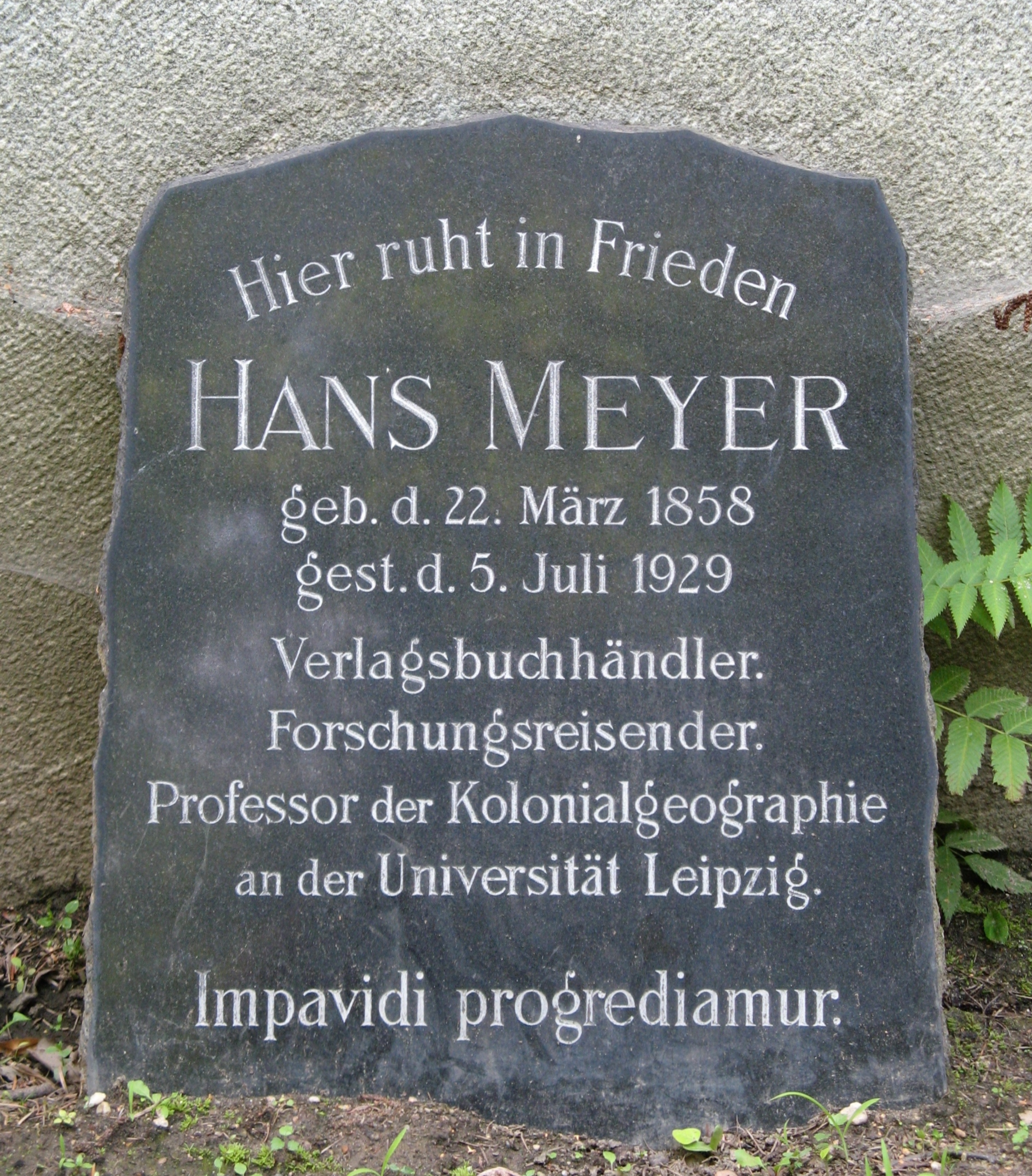
Gravestone of Hans Meyer in Leipzig

Hans Heinrich Josef Meyer (22 March 1858 – 5 July 1929) was a German geographer from Hildburghausen, who was the son of publisher Herrmann Julius Meyer (1826–1909). Hans Meyer is credited with being the first to reach the summit of Mount Kilimanjaro at 5,895 m (19,341 ft) in modern day Moshi District of Kilimanjaro Region in Tanzania. Kilimanjaro has three peaks: Shira, 3,962 m (12,999 ft); Mawenzi, 5,149 m (16,893 ft); and Kibo, whose summit was reached by Meyer in 1889.

== Biography ==
He studied sciences and history in Leipzig, Berlin and Straßburg, afterward traveling in India, North America and southern Africa. Subsequently he visited eastern Africa and South America. He entered the publishing house of his father, the Bibliographisches Institut at Leipzig, in 1884, and in the following year became one of the directors of the firm, but at intervals he continued his exploring expeditions.

In 1887, during his first attempt to climb Kilimanjaro, Meyer reached the base of Kibo, but was forced to turn back. He did not have the equipment necessary to handle the deep snow and ice on Kibo. In 1888, alongside the Austrian cartographer Oscar Baumann, he explored the Usambara region, with designs of continuing on to Mount Kilimanjaro. However, the two explorers could not proceed on, due to events related with the so-called Abushiri Revolt. Baumann and Meyer, within a matter of days, were captured and held as prisoners. Only after a large ransom was paid to rebel leader Abushiri ibn Salim al-Harthi were the two men released.

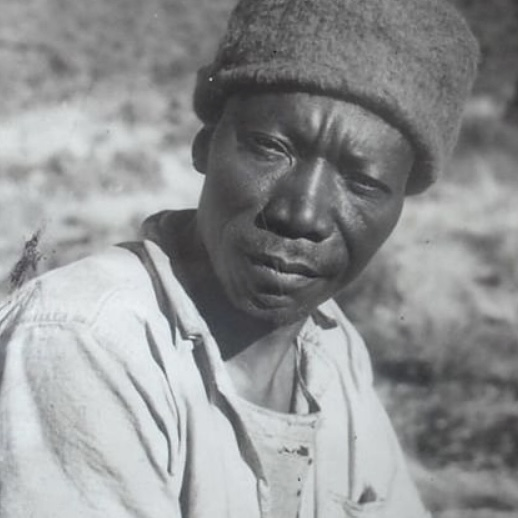
Yohane Kinyaha Lauwo, a Chagga man summited with Hans Meyer in 1889

In 1889 Meyer returned to Kilimanjaro with the celebrated Austrian mountaineer Ludwig Purtscheller and Yohane Lauwo, a Chagga guide for a third attempt. Their climbing team included two local headmen, nine porters, a cook, and a guide. After Meyer and Purtscheller pushed to near the crater rim on 3 October before retreating to the base of Kibo, they reached the summit on the southern rim of the crater on Purtscheller's 40th birthday, 6 October 1889. Meyer named this summit - now known as Uhuru Point- "Kaiser Wilhelm Spitze". After descending to the saddle between Kibo and Mawenzi, they attempted to climb Mawenzi next, but only reached a subsidiary peak (Klute Peak) before retreating due to illness. In Meyer's honor, the highest summit of Mawenzi nevertheless is known as Hans Meyer Peak. The summit of Kibo would not be climbed again until 20 years later, and the first ascent of Hans Meyer Peak was only in 1912.

In 1899 he became a professor at the University of Leipzig, where in 1915 he was appointed director of the Institute for Colonial Geography. In addition to his African exploits, Meyer did extensive mountain climbing in the Canary Islands (1894) and Ecuador (1904).

Meyer assembled a significant collection of ethnographic specimens during his visits to various nations and by trading with antiquities traders such as W. D. Webster. He donated his collection to Museum für Völkerkunde zu Leipzig (now the Grassi Museum of Ethnology).

== Selected publications ==
- Eine Weltreise (A Trip around the World), 1885
- Zum Schneedom des Kilima-Ndscharo, 1888
- Ostafrikanische Gletscherfahrten, 1890 (later translated into English by E.H.S. Calder as "Across East African Glaciers")
- Die Insel Tenerife (The Island of Tenerife), 1896
- Der Kilima-Ndscharo (Kilimanjaro), 1900
- Die Eisenbahnen im tropischen Afrika (Railways in Tropical Africa), 1902
- In den Hoch-Anden von Ecuador: Chimborazo, Cotopaxi, etc. (In the High Andes of Ecuador; Chimborazo, Cotopaxi, etc.), two volumes 1907
- Niederländisch-Ostindien. Eine länderkundliche Skizze (The Netherlands Indies; Sketch of the Country), 1922
