= Korogwe Town Council =

District of Tanga Region, Tanzania

Korogwe Mjini Wilaya ya Korogwe Mjini (Swahili)
- District
- Wilaya ya Korogowe Mjini, Mkoa wa Tanga
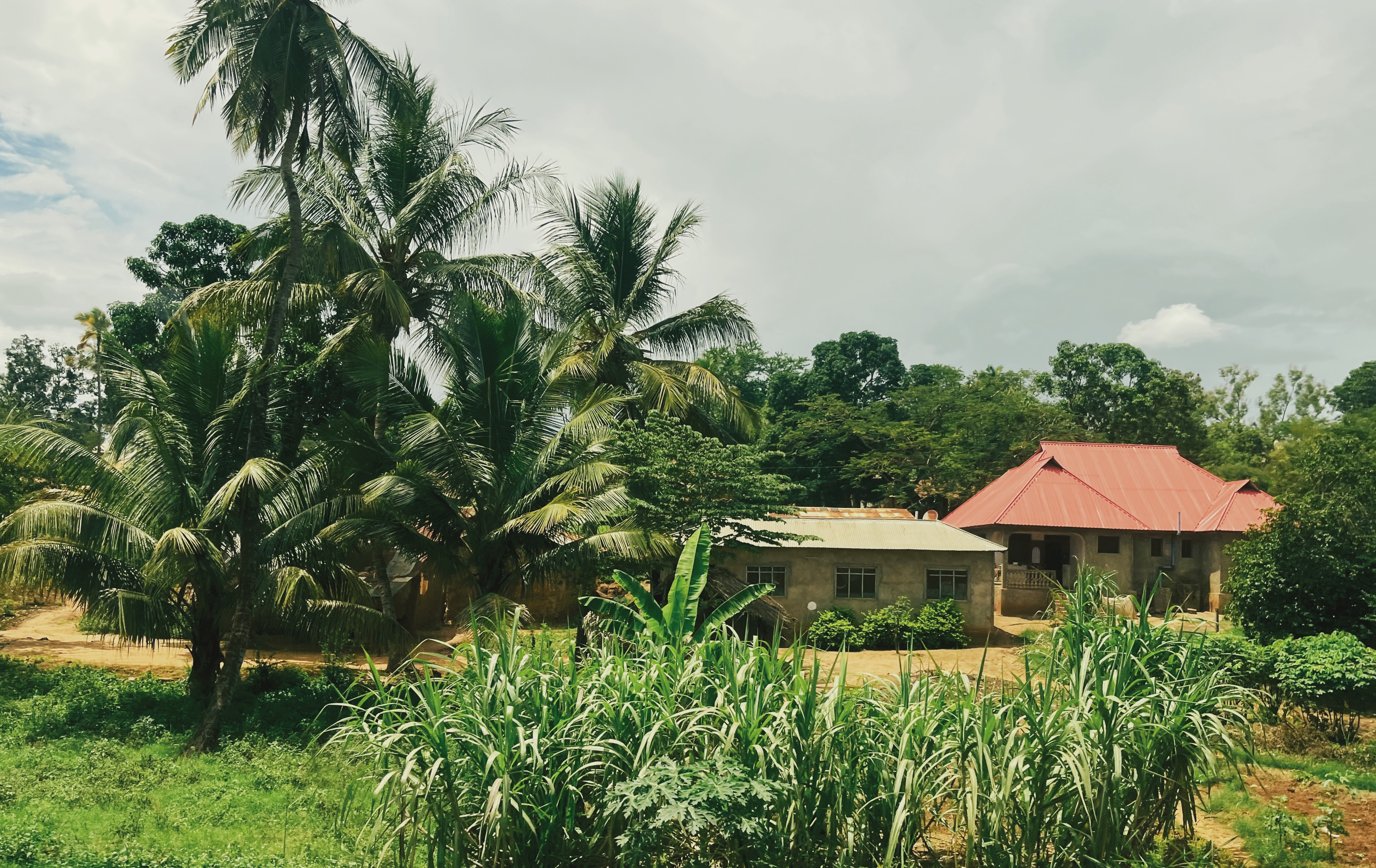
- Streetview of Kilole Ward, Korogwe Town
- Nickname: City on the banks of Pangani
- Korogwe Town in Tanga 2022
- Coordinates: 5°9′39.6″S 38°27′12.96″E
- Country: Tanzania
- Region: Tanga Region
- Capital: Mkata

Area
  - Total: 225.3 km^{2} (87.0 sq mi)

Population (2012)
  - Total: 68,308
  - Density: 303.2/km^{2} (785.3/sq mi)
- Demonym: Town Korogwean

Ethnic groups
  - Settler: Swahili
  - Native: Sambaa, Bondei & Digo
- Website: korogwetc.go.tz

Korogwe Urban District (or Korogwe Town Council) is one of the eleven districts of the Tanga Region of Tanzania. The District covers an area of 225.3 km^{2} (87.0 sq mi). Korogwe Urban District is bordered to the north by Korogwe Rural District and to the south by Handeni Rural District. The administrative capital of the district is Korogwe town. According to the 2012 Tanzania National Census, the population of Korogwe Urban District was 68,308.

== Transport ==
Paved trunk road T2 from Dar es Salaam to Arusha passes through the district.

== Administrative subdivisions ==
As of 2012, Korogwe Urban District was administratively divided into 8 wards.

=== Wards ===
1. Kilole
2. Kwamndolwa
3. Kwamsisi
4. Magunga
5. Manundu
6. Mtonga
7. Ngombezi
8. Old Korogwe
