= Lugalo =

Village in Iringa Region, Tanzania

Coordinates: 7°44′14″S 35°52′40″E

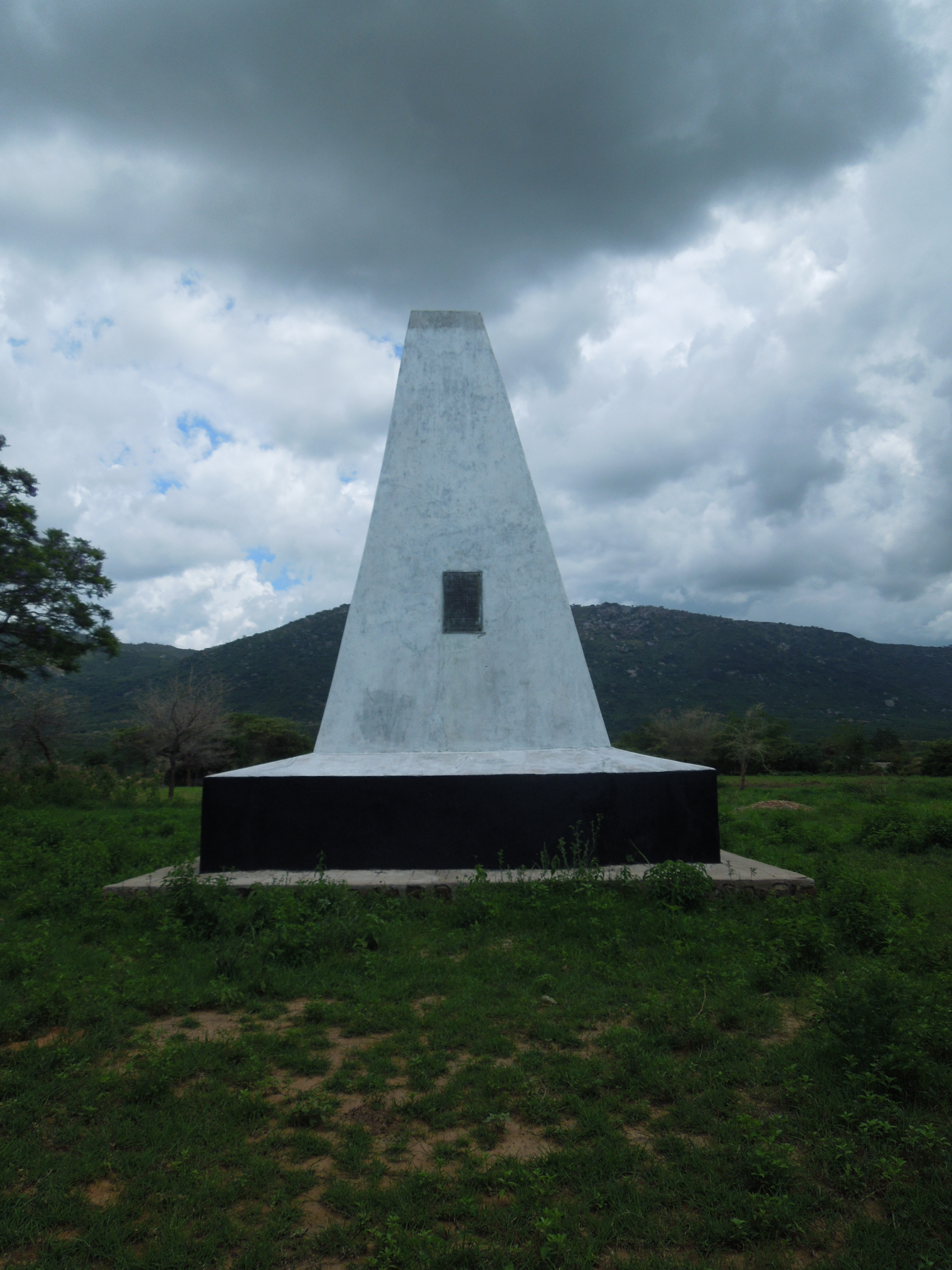
Monument erected by the Germans after the battle

Lugalo is a village in Tanzania near Iringa which in 1891 was the site of a battle in which a German colonial military force under Emil von Zelewski was decisively defeated and almost annihilated by the Hehe army of Chief Mkwawa. This was the first major defeat for the German Schutztruppe and the beginning of the Hehe wars.

A German monument marks the site next to the modern TANZAM highway.

== See also ==
- German East Africa
