= Oscar Baumann =

Austrian explorer, cartographer and ethnographer

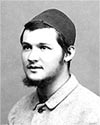
- Born: June 25, 1864; Vienna, Austrian Empire
- Died: October 12, 1899 (aged 35); Vienna, Austria-Hungary
- Education: University of Leipzig
- Occupations: Explorer; cartographer; ethnographer
- Years active: 1885–1899
- Known for: Exploration of German East Africa; First European to enter Rwanda and Ngorongoro Crater

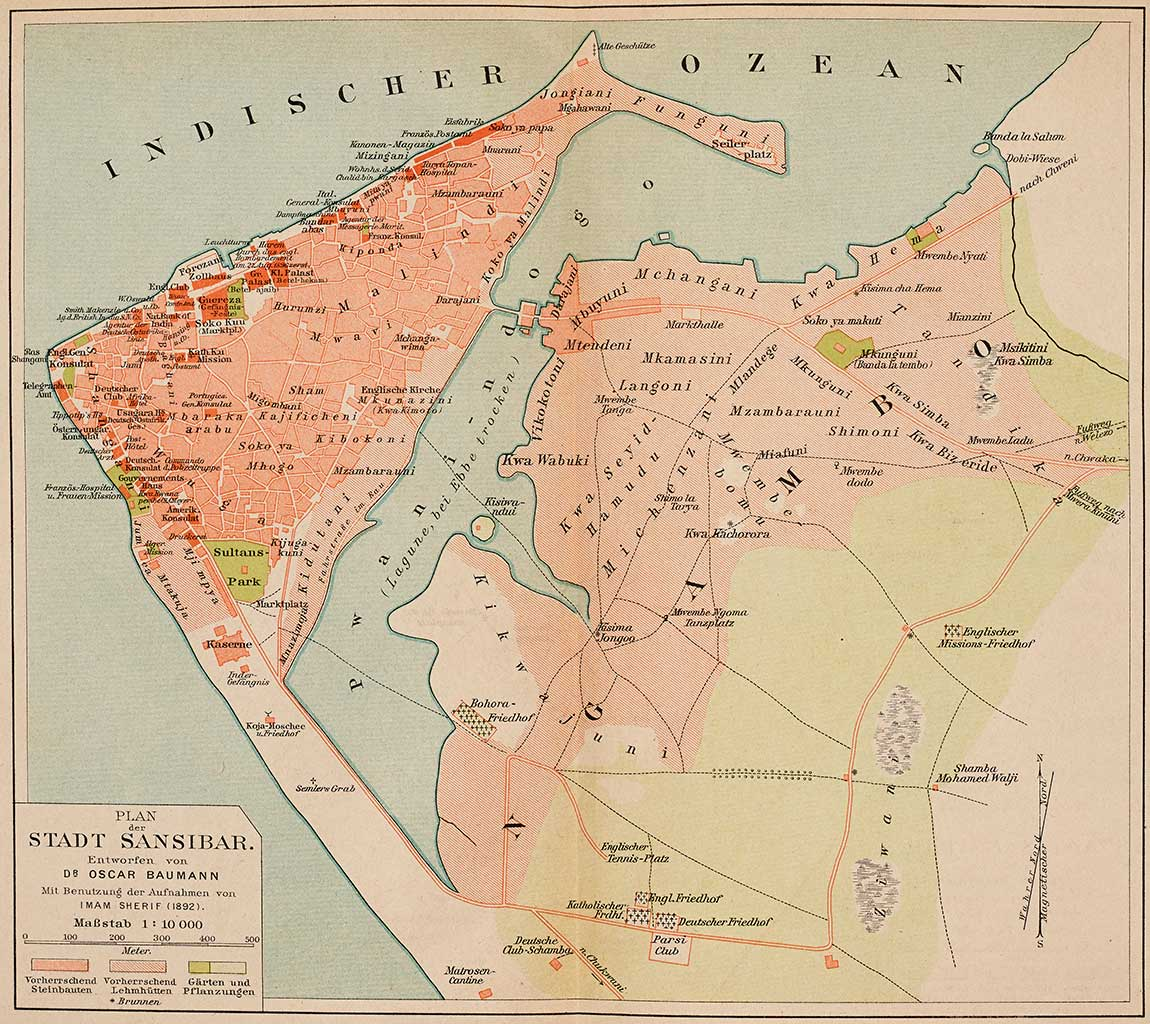
Map of Zanzibar by Baumann, 1892

Oscar Baumann (25 June 1864 in Vienna – 12 October 1899 in Vienna) was an Austrian explorer, cartographer and ethnographer.

He attended classes on natural history and geography at the University of Vienna, and in 1885 was part of an Austrian exploratory expedition of the Congo Basin under the direction of Oskar Lenz. However, because of serious illness, Baumann would be forced to leave the expedition prior to its conclusion. In 1886, he conducted ethnographical research on the island of Fernando Po. When he returned to Europe, he received his doctorate from the University of Leipzig (1888).

Baumann is best known for his exploration of the interior of German East Africa (present-day Tanzania, Rwanda and Burundi), and for producing maps of the region. In 1888, with geographer Hans Meyer, he explored the Usambara region, with designs of continuing on to Mount Kilimanjaro. The two explorers' progress was stopped, however, due to ramifications associated with the so-called "Abushiri Revolt" (1888–89). Within a matter of days Baumann and Meyer were captured and held as prisoners. According to the British Rear-Admiral Edmund Fremantle:

'They had been robbed, stripped, and subjected to every indignity, but except that they have lost all, including their instruments and observations, they do not seem much the worse'.

Only after a large ransom was paid to rebel leader Abushiri ibn Salim al-Harthi were the two men released.

Baumann's most celebrated mission was the 200-member "Maasai Expedition" of 1891–93. On the expedition, he performed map-making duties, and was the first European to enter Rwanda (1892). He was also the first European to visit Lake Eyasi, Lake Manyara, and Ngorongoro Crater. On the expedition, he explored the headwaters of the Kagera River, which he reasoned, was the true source of the Nile. As a result of the journey, he produced a book titled "Durch Massailand zur Nilquelle" (By Massailand to the Source of Nile, 1894) .

In 1896, Baumann was appointed consul to Zanzibar by the Austro-Hungarian government. However, he died a few years later of an infectious disease at the age of 35. In 1902 the thoroughfare Baumannstraße, in the district of Landstraße (Vienna), was named in his honour. The highest point of the German protectorate Togoland was called the Baumannspitze (present-day Mount Agou in Togo).

== Written works by Oscar Baumann ==
- Beiträge zur Ethnologie des Congo, 1887.
- Versuch einer Monographie von Fernando Póo, 1888 (dissertation).
- Fernando Po and the Bube. Vienna (1888).
- In Deutsch-Ostafrika während des Aufstandes (In German East Africa during the Rebellion), Vienna (1890) (online here).
- * Usambara und seine Nachbargebiete. Allgemeine Darstellung des nordöstlichen Deutsch - Ostafrika und seiner Bewohner, Berlin 1891 (Usambara and its adjacent territories. General description of the North Eastern German East Africa and its inhabitants) online here.
- Karte des nordöstlichen Deutsch-Ostafrika (Map of northeastern German East Africa), Berlin (1893).
- Durch Massailand zur Nilquelle (By Massailand to the Source of the Nile), Berlin (1894).
- "Die kartographischen Ergebnisse der Massai-Expedition" (The cartographic results of the Massai expedition), in: Petermann's Geographische Mitteilungen, Ergebnisheft 111, Gotha (1894).
- The Sansibar archipelago. 3 booklets. Leipzig (1896–99).
- Afrikanische Skizzen (African sketches), Berlin (1900).
