= Będargowo, Pomeranian Voivodeship =

Będargowo
- Village
- Location within Poland
- Coordinates: 54°25′36″N 18°7′36″E
- Country: Poland
- Voivodeship: Pomeranian
- County: Wejherowo
- Gmina: Szemud
- Population: 678

Będargowo [bɛndarˈɡɔvɔ] (Kashubian: Bãdargòwò; German: Bendargau) is a village in the administrative district of Gmina Szemud, within Wejherowo County, Pomeranian Voivodeship, in northern Poland.

For details of the history of the region, see History of Pomerania.

The village has a population of 678.
