= Abushiri revolt =

1888–1890 rebellion in German East Africa

- Part of the Scramble for Africa
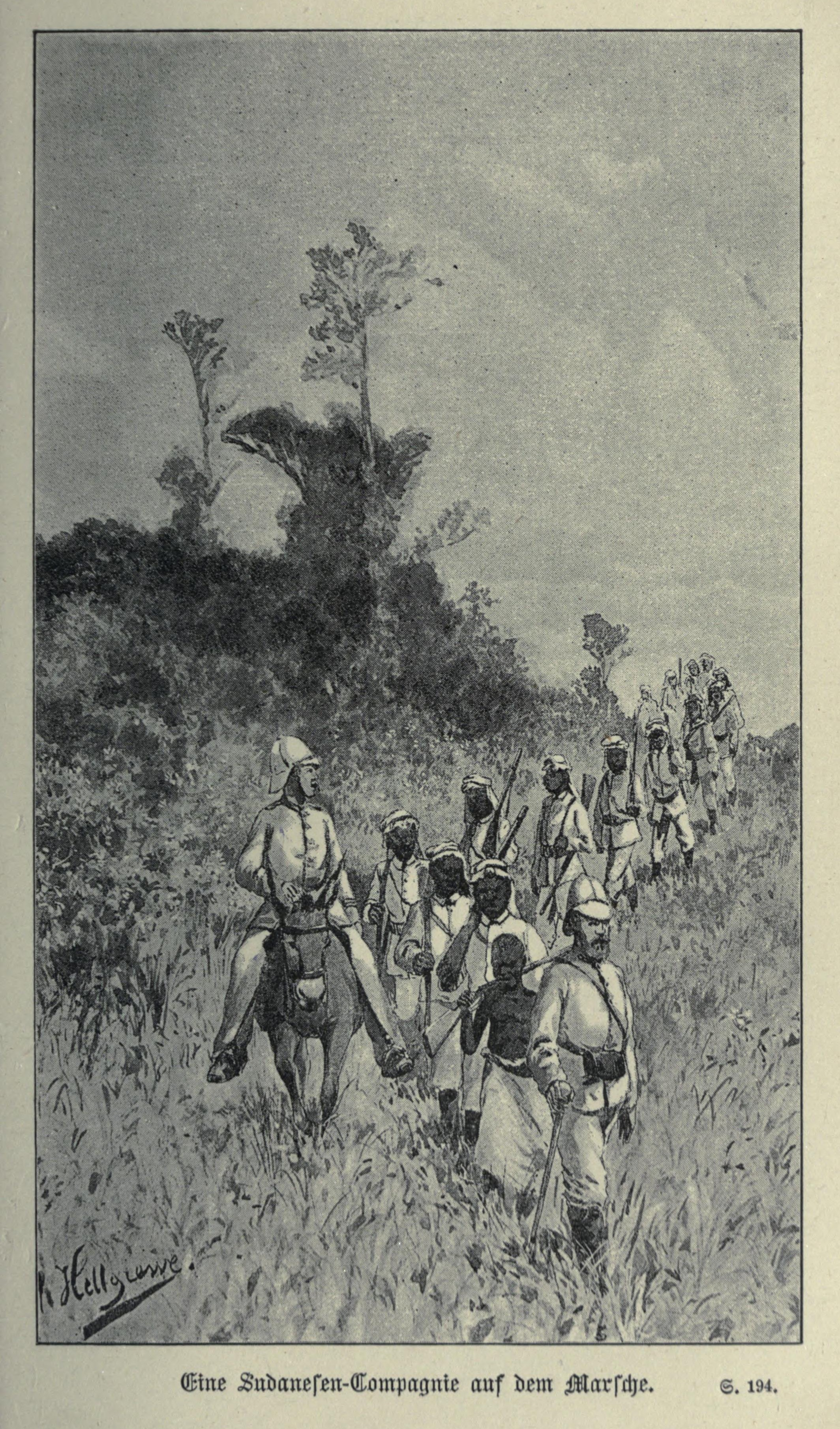
- A German company of Sudanese askaris on the march during the Abushiri Revolt (by Rudolf Hellgrewe, 1891)
Date	1888–1890
Location	German East Africa (modern-day Tanzania)
Result	German victory: Rebellion suppressed; German Government takes control of Tanganyika from German East Africa Company

Belligerents
(German Empire) Germany: German East Africa Company	Arab and Swahili Rebels

Commanders and leaders
(German Empire) Hermann Wissmann; Emil von Zelewski	Abushiri ibn Salim al-Harthi (executed)

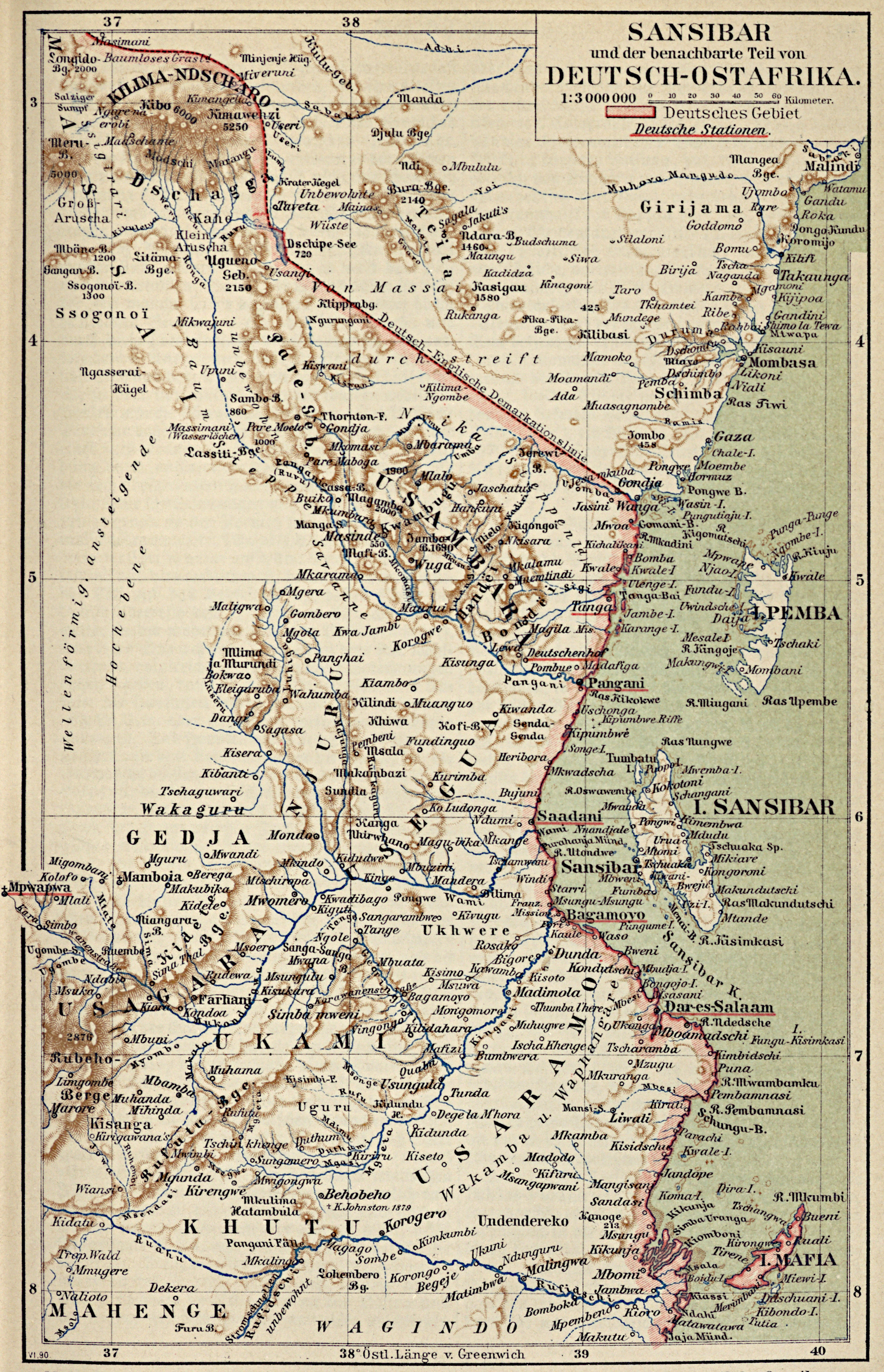
Zanzibar and German East Africa, Meyers Konversations-Lexikon, 1885-90

The Abushiri Revolt, also known as the Slave Trader Revolt (German: Sklavenhändlerrevolte), but generally referred to by modern historians as the Coastal Rebellion, was an insurrection in 1888–1889 by the Arab, Swahili and African population of the coast of what is now Tanzania. This coast had been leased, under protest, to Germany by the Sultan of Zanzibar in 1888. The rebellion was eventually suppressed by a German expeditionary force commanded by Hermann Wissmann.

== Background ==
In late 1884, an expedition of the Society for German Colonization, led by Carl Peters, had reached Zanzibar and induced certain chiefs in the hinterland of the African mainland to sign "protection contracts" promising vast areas to the society. Once it had gained a foothold, Peters' new German East Africa Company acquired further lands on the mainland up to the Uluguru and Usambara Mountains. That met with opposition by Sultan Barghash bin Said of Zanzibar, who nevertheless had to yield after Peters had obtained official support from the Foreign Office in Berlin and a fleet of the Kaiserliche Marine (German Navy) under Konteradmiral Eduard von Knorr appeared off the Zanzibar coast.

Negotiations between Germany and Britain late in 1886 established the final boundaries of the colony of German East Africa, but reserved a strip of land, ten miles wide, along the coast as the property of the Sultan of Zanzibar. On 28 April 1888, Sultan Khalifah bin Said finally signed a treaty, leasing the coastal strip to the German East Africa Company.

From August 1888, the company tried to take over the coastal towns against fierce resistance from the Arab elite, who feared for their slave and ivory trade, and also from the Swahili and African population. The company's administrator, Ernst Vohsen, made no attempt to conciliate his new subjects. He decreed that owners of land were obliged to register and prove ownership of their holdings, and that all other land would pass into the ownership of the company. Various other levies and rules were imposed, and the Sultan's former officials and military forces were taken under the control of the company, on much reduced salaries. The haughty attempts by Emil von Zelewski, the German administrator in Pangani, to raise the company's flag over the town sparked the uprising.

== Revolt ==
The revolt around Pangani was led by the plantation-owner Abushiri ibn Salim al-Harthi, who gained the support of both the Arabs of the area and local Swahili tribes. Abushiri's father was an ethnic Arab and his mother an Oromo. The south of the colony was soon also in revolt, with Yao warriors from the interior taking a leading role. The Germans were expelled from Lindi and Mikindani, and those in Kilwa were killed. It was only Dar es Salaam and Bagamoyo which remained in German hands.

In January 1889, German Chancellor Otto von Bismarck intervened and appointed Lieutenant Hermann Wissmann as Reichskommissar for German East Africa. Wissmann created a Schutztruppe of German officers and African askari soldiers whom he hired in Egypt and Mozambique. The German and British navies collaborated in establishing a blockade of the East African coast, to prevent assistance reaching the rebels. Wissmann's force landed at Bagamoyo early in May 1889, and from there they advanced against Abushiri's fort, which they seized with great loss of life to the defenders. Abushiri retired to the interior, but he was pursued by Wissmann and returned to the coast, where he was captured and executed on 15 December 1889.

The other major rebel leader in the north was Bwana Heri, a former trader who had established himself as ruler of the Saadani district. He repulsed a German force in December 1889, but further expeditions early in 1890 caused him to surrender and submit to German rule. Wissmann then took his forces to the south of the colony, where with the assistance of the German navy he had no difficulty in recapturing the coastal towns in May 1890. However the Yao chief, Machemba, from his fastness on the Makonde Plateau, was able to repel the forces sent against him by the Germans. He finally negotiated a peace agreement with his opponents in May 1891.

== Aftermath ==
The revolt had revealed the complete inability of the German East Africa Company to administer its territory. On 1 January 1891 the German Imperial government assumed control of German East Africa, and the company received extremely generous financial compensation. The very effective military force established by Hermann Wissmann was converted into the Kaiserliche Schutztruppe für Deutsch-Ostafrika. Under Wissmann's command, it proceeded to establish German rule over the caravan routes to Kilimanjaro and Lake Tanganyika, as the next stage in the complete subjection of the territory.

The German victors dismissed the Coastal Rebellion of 1888–90 as an "Arab Rebellion," as reflected in the title of Rochus Schmidt's standard history of the military campaign. It was not until the publication of Jonathan Glassman's doctoral thesis in 1995 that a fuller picture of the rebellion emerged, with a better understanding of the motivations of the different elements of the coastal population, and of how these combined to spark the rebellion.

The German historian, Jörg Haustein, has expressed very effectively the latest thinking on this question:

by dubbing al-Bushiri's military resistance the 'Arab Uprising,' the Germans completely misread the political dynamics beneath the opposition they faced. In the decades prior to the arrival of the Germans, Tanganyika had seen a progressive encroachment of Omani military and administrative power, which altered the established trading networks and socioeconomic relations between Shirazi patricians, Indian merchants, and Arab traders of various origins (Hadramaut, Comoro, Zanzibar). As Glassman pointed out, the German colonizers were tolerated as long as they were seen as challenging Omani domination. However, with the treaty of 1888, Germans were perceived as clients of the sultan, and now their former allies turned against them, simultaneously contesting German and Omani authority over the coast. The uprising, in other words, indicated the precariousness of Omani Arab hegemony, rather than 'Arab' leadership, and was rooted in a social contest that pitted diverse religious and ethnic identities … against each other.
