= Abushiri =

Colonial resistance fighter from modern-day Tanzania

Al Bashir ibn Salim al-Harthi
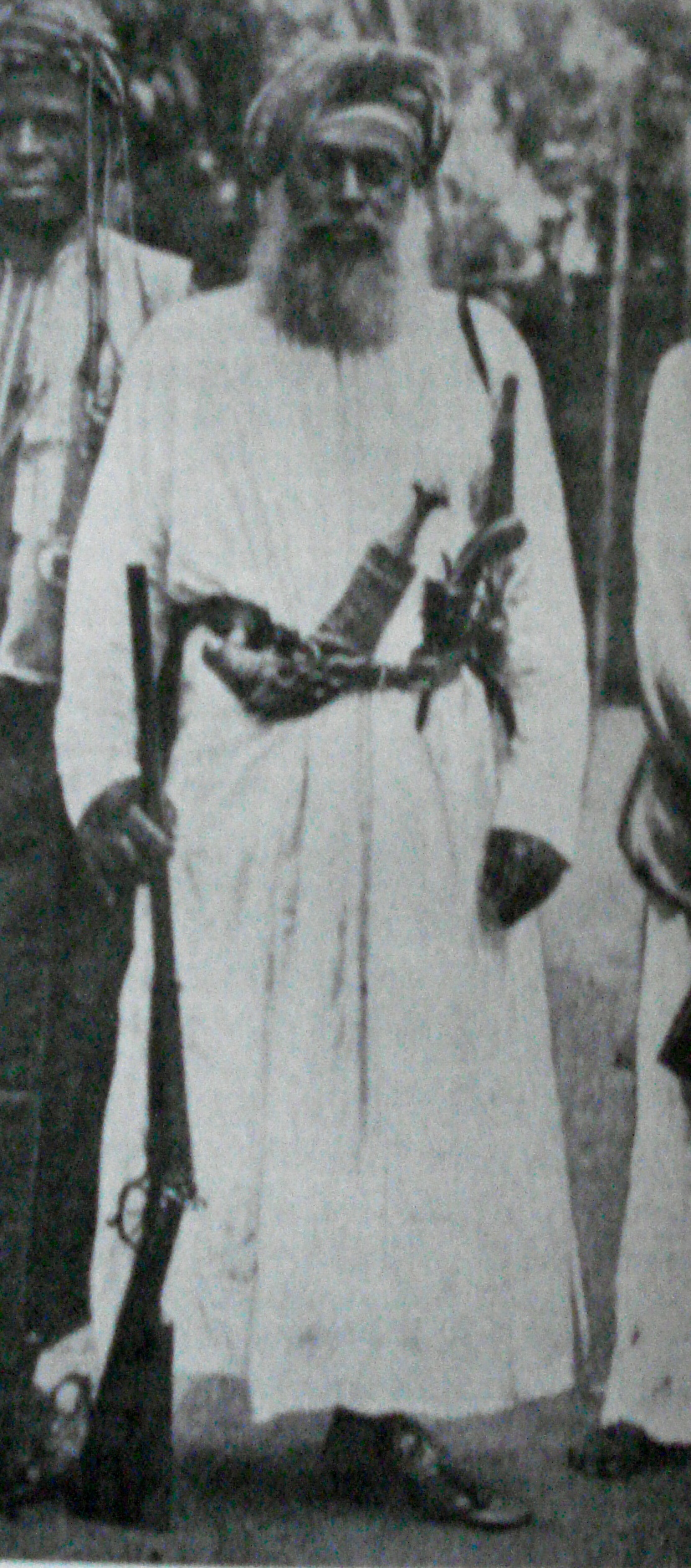
- Al-Harthi with freedom fighters during the revolt in German occupied East Africa.
- Born: Al Bashir ibn Salim al-Harthi c. 1840 Sultanate of Zanzibar
- Died: 15 December 1889 (aged 49); Pangani, Tanga Region, German East Africa
- Cause of death: Execution by hanging

Al Bashir ibn Salim al-Harthi (Arabic: البشير بن سالم الحارثي) (c.1840 - 15 December 1889), was a wealthy merchant and slave-owning plantation owner of Omani Arab and Oromo parentage (from his mother's side) who is known for the Abushiri Revolt against the German East Africa Company in present-day Tanzania. He is credited with uniting local Arab traders and African tribes against German colonialism.

Beginning on September 20, 1888, insurrections led by Abushiri attacked German-held trading posts and towns throughout the East African territory. The German trading company, unable to control the uprising appealed to the government in Berlin for assistance. Chancellor Otto von Bismarck dispatched 34-year-old Lieutenant Hermann Wissmann as Reichskommissar to the colony. Wissmann along with a combination of German, Sudanese and Shangaen soldiers formed the core of the first Schutztruppe in the region. With naval assistance they bombarded coastal towns which allowed for German re-occupation. Also the Navy set up a blockade to deny shipments of arms and supplies to reach the rebels.

Al Bashir's forces were able to capture most of the towns along the Tanganyika coast and even took the explorers Hans Meyer and Oscar Baumann hostage. Nevertheless, towards the end of 1888, much of his alliance with the local tribes had collapsed, and he was forced to hire Arab mercenaries to defend his stronghold at a fortress near Bagamoyo. After Abushiri accepted a truce with the Germans, troops led by Wissmann attacked the fortress on May 8, 1889, resulting in 106 Arab deaths. Abushiri escaped and was able to persuade members of the Mbunga tribes to continue with the rebellion. He was then able to lead new assaults on Dar es Salaam and Bagamoyo. However, superior German firepower was able to repulse these attacks, and the African tribesmen soon deserted Abushiri.

A Zigua headman captured Abushiri and turned him over to the Germans, who hanged him on 15 December 1889 at Pangani.
