= Shambaa people =

Ethnic group from Tanga Region of Tanzania

Sambaa
Wasambaa

Total population
- 664,000

Regions with significant populations
- Tanzania Tanga Region (Lushoto District) (Korogwe District) (Bumbuli District)

Languages
- Shambaa and Swahili

Religion
- Majority Islam, Minority Christianity and African Traditional Religion

Related ethnic groups
- Bondei, Zigua, Digo, Shiraz and other peoples

- Person: Msambaa
- People: Wasambaa
- Language: Kisambaa

The Shambaa people, also called the Sambaa, Shambala, Sambala or Sambara are an ethnic group. The Sambaa people are related to the Bondei people. Their ancestral home is on the Usambara Mountains of Lushoto District, Korogwe District and Bumbuli District. They are native to the valleys and eastern Usambara Mountains of Korogwe District, Korogwe Urban District and western Muheza District of northern Tanga Region of Tanzania. The word Shamba means "farm", and these people live in one of the most fertile Tanzanian regions. Shambaai in Kisambaa means "where the bananas thrive". In 2001, the Shambaa population was estimated to number 664,000.

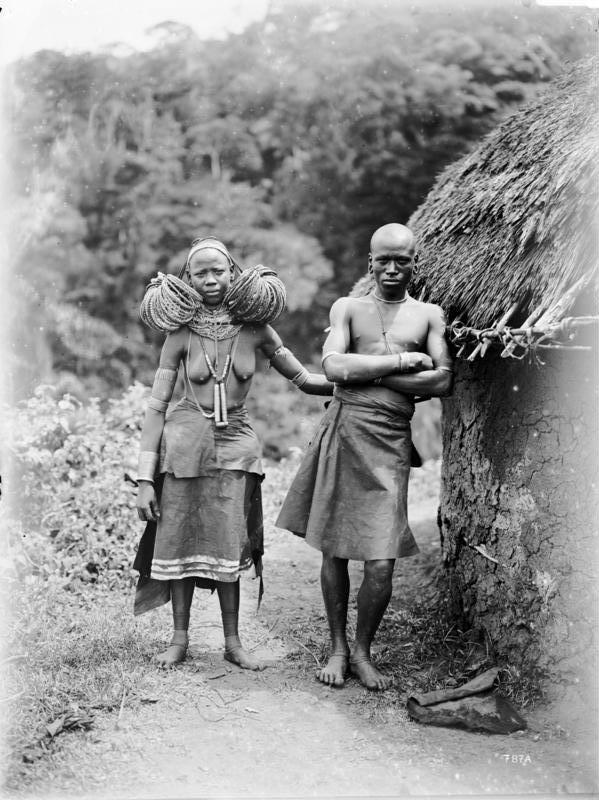
Sambaa couple c.1890s

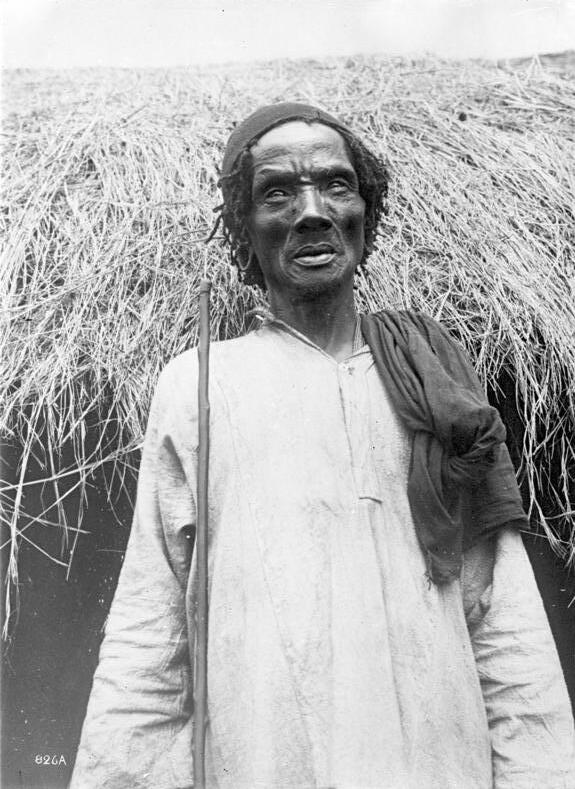
a Shambaa elder, early 20th century

== Overview and origins ==
The Shambaa lived on one of the numerous isolated mountain blocks of the Usambaras in the northeast, a "green island in a brown sea." According to their historian, "The Shambaa" are inhabitants of a distinct botanical habitat that was unique to that region. Its native name, Shambaai, literally translates to "where bananas thrive," and the locals used it to distinguish it from the nearby nyika, or dry plains. In eastern Tanganyika, where the contrast between the mountains and the plains is stark, this categorization by adaptation to a particular habitat was typical. The Bondei, or "people of the valley," were the Shamba's lowland neighbors.

Below 1,000 meters, malaria is endemic, and it is seasonal in many higher locations. Since it was frequently fatal to the young and crippling to their seniors, it was probably a significant population growth restraint and another reason why people preferred the highlands. The highlanders of Shambaa were aware of the link between malaria and mosquitoes and were afraid to stay even one night in the nyika.

When a Shambaa left the mountains, he frequently lost his identity as a Shambaa. Civilization was the result of a people's environmental adaption. Mbegha, the hero credited with founding the Shambaa empire, was the subject of a fantastic legend among the Shambaa. According to the legend, he hunted wild pigs in the nearby region of Ungulu. Because he had cut his upper teeth first when he was a baby, his kinsmen withheld his inheritance because they believed he was mystically dangerous. As a result, he ran away and hunted till he reached Usambara.

He met Shambaa there. Megha provided them with meat, and they fed him vegetables. They gave him a wife when he slaughtered the wild pigs that were destroying their crops. They made him their king after he killed a lion that had been attacking their cattle. The story contrasted the life of a hunter with an agriculturalist's, as well as meat with veggie sustenance, among its many levels of meaning. Megha was a fierce hunter who was outside the bounds of civilized civilization until the Shamba gave him vegetable food and introduced him to their way of life, civilizing him. The dichotomy between cultivated land and the wilderness of the nyika and the mountain rainforest that they had been clearing for generations was important to Shambaa views of civilization.

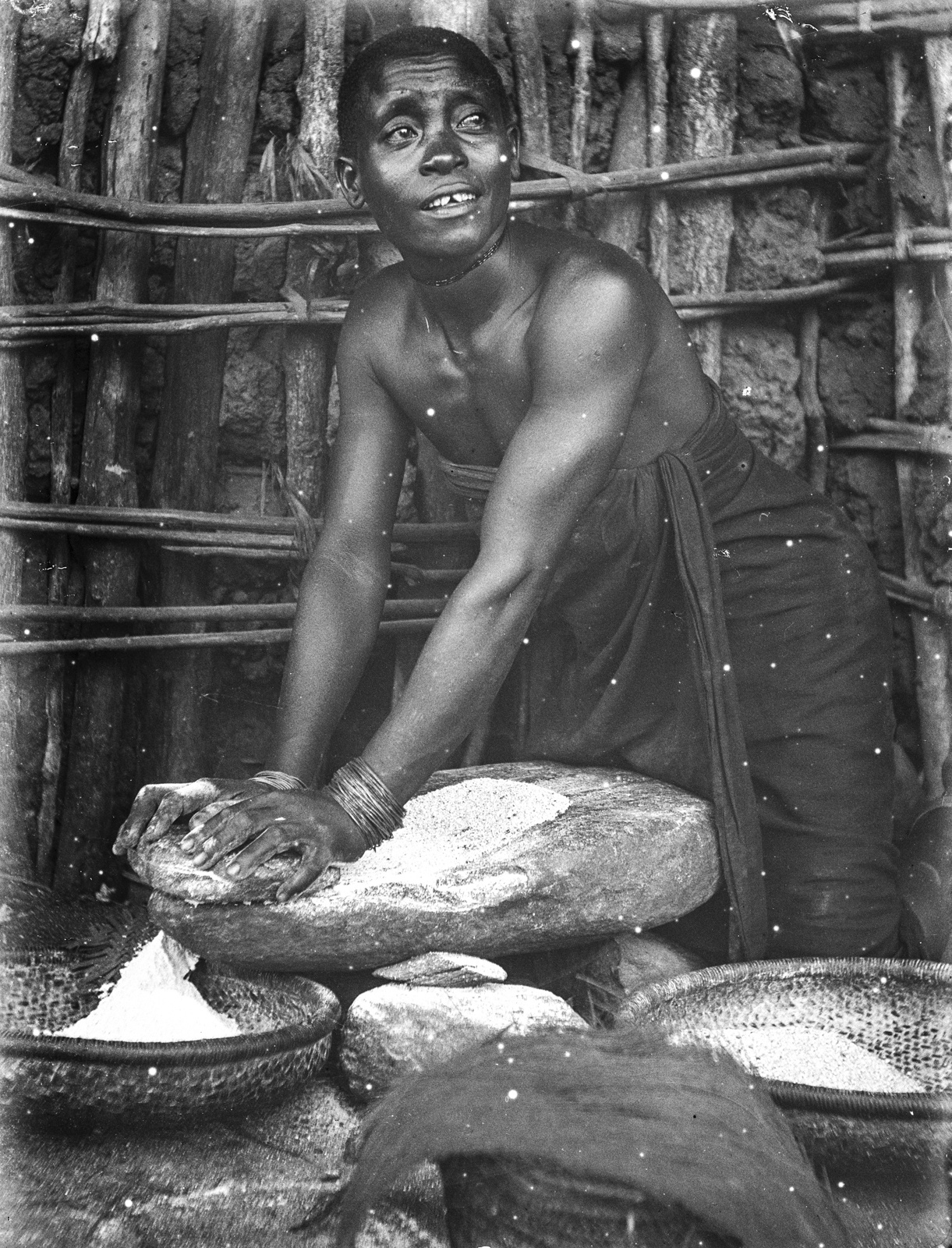
Shambaa woman processing grain c. 1901. Taken by Techmer, Fritz

== Language ==
The Shambaa people speak the Shambala language, also known as Kisambaa, Kishambaa, Kishambala, Sambaa, Sambala, Sambara, Schambala, Shambaa.

Kishambaa is the Sambaa word for the Shambala language, Wasambaa are the people (Msambaa for a person), and Usambaa or Usambara is used for Sambaa lands. The Shambaa call their lands Shambalai.

They are related to the Bondei and Zigua people, and the Shambala language is mutually intelligible with Bondei and Zigua, with the three groups sharing significant overlap in territory and a long history of intermarriage. The similarity between them has prompted some to refer to themselves as "Boshazi" (the first syllable from each of the three groups).

Sambaa belongs to the North East Coastal Bantu languages. This is a group which includes Swahili; however, Swahili is not mutually intelligible with Sambaa.

== History ==
=== Early history ===
Some members of the Sambaa community assert that they have lived in the Usambara mountains for all of recorded history. Other groups claim to have arrived much earlier than the Kilindi. During famines in Zigualand, usually in Ngulu, the majority of the ancient clans of southern Usambara assert that they made their way up into the fertile hills. They benefited from greater rainfall and hardy banana trees after relocating to the highlands. They built extensive irrigation systems. Some made their home at the edge of the plains near the base of the mountains, while others moved higher up the hillsides and cut their way through the forests at the top of the mountains. The Shambaa were still clearing forests when European settlers arrived in the late nineteenth century. It appears that the immigrants started by chopping around the mountain's edge and continued all the way up to the higher, more central areas of Usambara.

There was obviously no central political authority in those days, and people from villages a mile apart would be wary of one another. Typically, all of an ancestor's descendants would reside on a single hill, apart from those of other ancestors. The local populace offered sacrifices to the ancestors as a group. It was always possible for some individuals to relocate to a different village, and the relationship between the two villages would frequently lose significance. Despite this, it was evident that meeting and working together was important for the residents of multiple villages, even in cases where economic specialization was not the source of cooperation. The person conducting the ritual in rites of passage and ancestor sacrifices had to be unfamiliar with the host village.

Marriage served as a bridge between two communities. Although the men of a single village were remarkably self-sufficient in their daily activities, the early Shambaa's religion mandated frequent meetings and communal drinking, feasting, and dancing. When there were disagreements between two villages, the elders from a wider region would get together to talk about the situation. There was some economic cooperation and specialization at the same time. It was evident that an entire neighborhood benefited from shared irrigation works. The only way to obtain shell ornaments, which were required for some rituals, was through coastal trade. A few locations on the plains produced salt, which was traded throughout Usambara. Iron tools for a whole area were made by designated blacksmiths.

The Masai people migrated to Tanzania from the north, probably in the early to late 1700s, and this contributed significantly to the development of more centralized political structures by the Sambaa. Because of the risk of Masai raids and violence, settlement on the lower slopes became more precarious, and even in the highest areas, centralized towns were helpful for defense. Furthermore, a considerable number of recent Sambaa immigrants were entering the relatively safe mountainous area. The Mbughu and Nango refugee groups were particularly significant. They both originated in roughly the same region that eventually became known as the Masai steppe. They ran east to Pare Mountains and from there to Shume, which is the western border of Usambara.

The Mbughu, an immigrant Cushitic pastoralist group, threatened the small clan-chiefdoms that Shambaa had initially established since their tribal structures were incompatible with the local cultivators' organization. Tradition holds that Mbegha, the roving hunter from Ungulu, was the old culture's savior.

He subdued the Shambaa by using force, guile, diplomacy, and marriage into Shambaa noble households. His empire was a living example of the previous way of life. Vugha, the royal capital, was created as a sizable Shambaa town and was thought to have 3,000 residents in 1857. The Shambaa state was founded on kinship. The monarchy aimed to undermine the strength and morality of the clans, but lineages arbitrated internal conflicts and assumed collective responsibility for their members. The Kilindi, a group of people with royal ancestry who were Mbegha's offspring according to Shambaa wives, represented the governmental system. Their maternal uncles, who were commoners, held the sub-chiefs of the Kilindi in check.

Cattle-keeping had been vital to both the Mbugu and Nango, and the Masai had threatened their lives and means of subsistence. The majority of the previous immigrants to Usambara were small-family groups from Zigua, Pare, and Taita, and they assimilate into Sambaa culture quite easily. However, the Nango and Mbughu attempted to preserve their individual identities and arrived in sizable, well-organized groups. Up until the era of colonization, the Mbughu people lived in isolation.

In the tall forests above the Shambaa farming, they took care of their cattle. The Nango migrated throughout the entire Shambaa settlement, assimilating into the language and absorbing much of the customs while upholding the religious customs they had carried with them. Large numbers of Nango had to periodically return to Shume to perform certain rituals. The head of all the Nango was a man of some influence who resided in Shume.

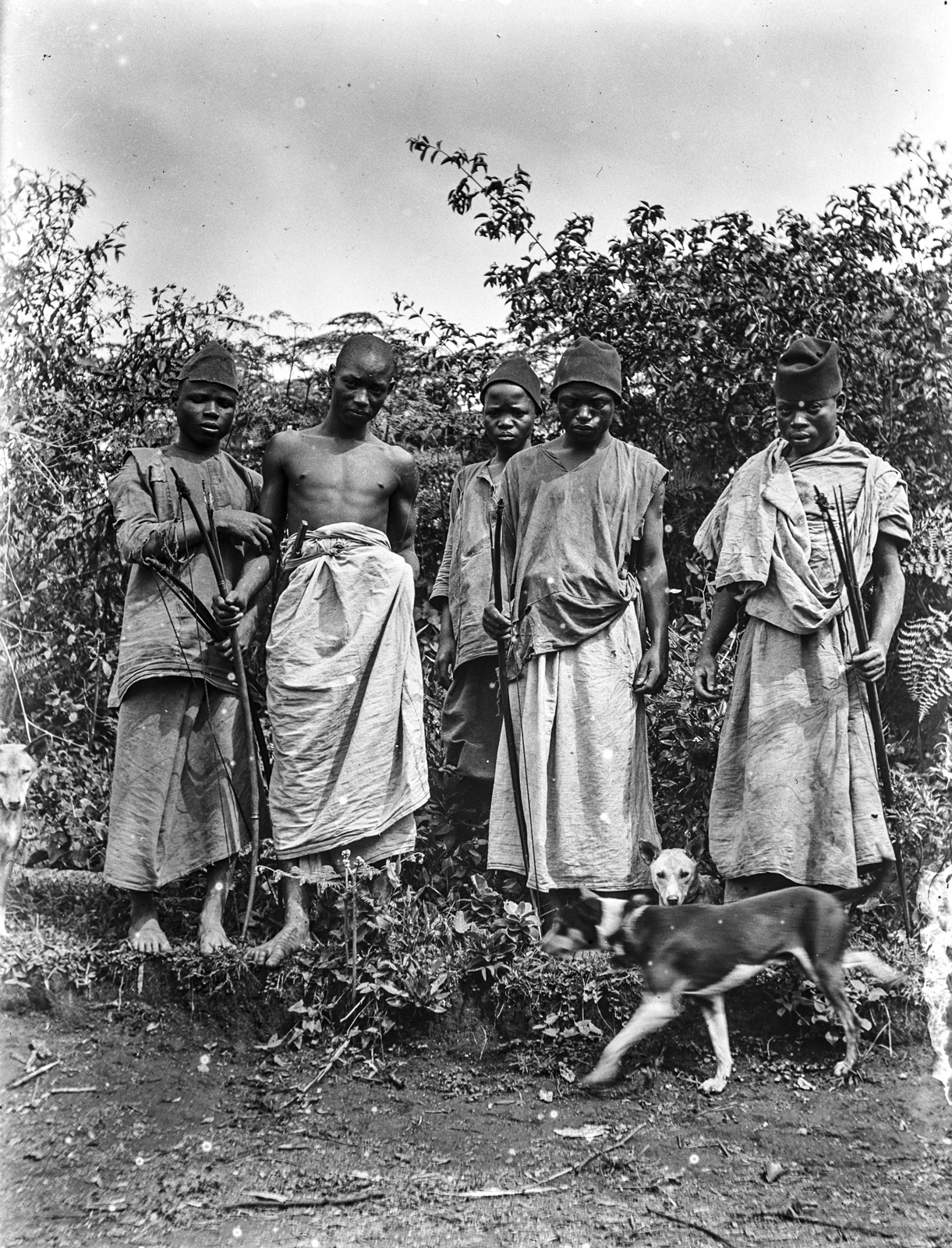
Shambaa men c. 1900s. Taken by Techmer, Fritz

== Shambaa Kingdom ==
=== Kilindi era ===
The WaSambaa were ruled by the Kilindi dynasty from the mid-18th century to the end of the 19th century. The founder of the dynasty was Mbegha, who was from Ngulu and his son Bughe established the hilltop capital at Vuga in the Usambaras. The kingdom reached its greatest extent under Kimweri ye Nyumbai. After he died in 1862 a civil war broke out over the succession, fueled by competition for the new wealth that the caravan trade in the Pangani valley had brought to the region.

The Kilindi originally arrived in the Usambara, which was in disarray due to the start of recent Masai raids and the inflow of a sizable number of immigrants from a foreign culture. The Kilindi, a group of royal people, arrived in this environment.

==== Mbegha's reign and the establishment of the Shambaa Kingdom ====
Mbegha was the name of the first Usambara king. All throughout Usambara, his story is told and repeated. Mbegha was a hunter in Ngulu, where it all began. After being driven from Ngulu by his relatives, he embarked on an extended journey of hunting and wandering. Mbegha came to Usambara to hunt near the mountains' southernmost point.

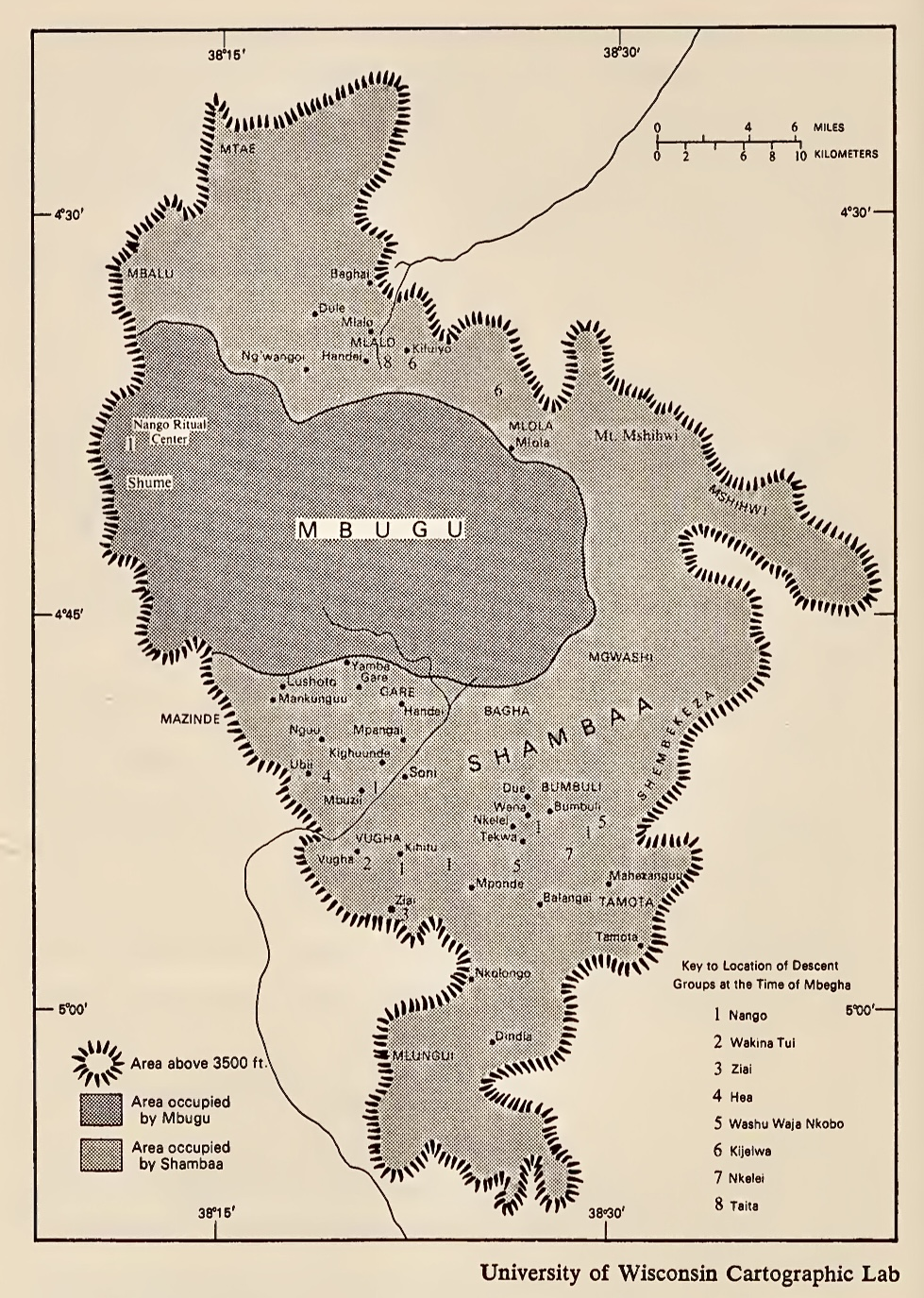
Map of Shambaa and Mbugu lands c1800s

When the Shambaa spotted him, he descended to find out who the stranger was. He gave the Shambaa meat in an incredibly kind gesture. The discovery of a hunter capable of eliminating the wild pigs that were despoiling all the crops thrilled the Shambaa. Mbegha proceeded on a victorious tour throughout Usambara, executing pigs, mediating conflicts, and giving away free meat. In appreciation and thanks, the Shambaa bestowed upon him wives and crowned him king of all Usambara.

During the more than a century that the Kilindi ruled Usambara, anyone who suggested that the Kilindi's rule was the result of cruel conquest, cun-ning, or threats faced the risk of death. To challenge the Mbegha narrative was to challenge Kilindi authority. So, even though the story might be true, we have to keep in mind that it is the story as the Kilindi intended it to be told.

There is conflicting evidence, which is why the Mbegha story is shrouded in doubt. According to a Nango tradition, Mbegha was a popular and giving man but lacked actual authority. During Mbegha's reign, a strongman from Shume by the name of Mbogho led the Nango. Mbegha had a child named Bughe after marrying Mbogho's daughter. The legend continues by explaining how Bughe is murder of his grandfather Mbogho established the true power of the Kilindi. Bughe stole the royal stool, the royal spear, and the headdress after the murder.

For a fair evaluation, the founding narratives of the Shambaa Kingdom from both the Nango and the Kilindi must be taken into consideration. It is improbable that the kingdom was founded without violence, and there are additional tales from the clan that corroborate the idea that force was employed. It may be true, though, that many Shambaa enthusiastically contributed to the creation of the kingdom.

The Kilindi put up a formidable defense because the Masai posed a serious threat. It is even possible that a large number of Shambaa thought Kilindi rule was preferable to Nango authority. Furthermore, the Shambaa may have welcomed rulers who could resolve conflicts through force rather than just negotiation during a period of cultural diversity within Usambara. The political structure of Usambara was reorganized with the arrival of Kilindi rule, but daily religious and customary practices remained unchanged. Rather than enforcing their own customs, the Kilindi actually had a tendency to adopt the ones they encountered. The fact that the Kilindi perform both the Nango and the Shambaa sacrifices to the ancestors is one illustration of how they handle cultural issues. When it came to performing rites of passage, the Kilindi rose to prominence, but they always adopted the Shambaa rituals.

The arrival of the Kilindi revolutionized Usambara's political life, but daily rituals such as birth, marriage, and death did not change. Throughout the majority of the kingdom's pre-colonial history, Usambara was led by five or six prominent chiefs. We may assume that there was a tendency toward independence from the Simba Mwene, the lion-king, since some chiefdoms were fairly remote from Vugha. Every significant chiefdom possessed a unique rain magic. Local disputes were resolved by each chief. The armed might of the Usambara state was composed of individual men, each armed with a bow and arrows, and the king's orders traveled only as fast as a man on foot.

By appointing his sons as chiefs, the Usambara king was able to maintain authority over a vast region. The fear of a father's curse prevented his sons from disobeying their father with ease. The hardest part of a king's reign was always the beginning, when he had to try to unseat his own sons and remove the sons of his predecessor, which meant removing his brothers. He could be removed with ease if his brothers banded together to oppose him. Because he had served as chief of Bumbuli while awaiting the throne, the new king's duties were made easier. This implies that he would have an ally as soon as he ascended to the throne if he decided to place a son in Bumbuli. Actually, the chiefdoms of Bumbuli and Vugha made up a sizable area of densely populated territory that was challenging to conquer.

After the king was established in Vugha, his authority was augmented by his unique standing in Shambaa law. The only way the chiefs could punish someone was if they accepted their error. At Vugha, the only person with the authority to decide a case by force without a confession was the king. This was how many cases came to Vugha, and as a result of the fines he levied, the king acquired cattle and slaves. A sizable share of the slaves and cattle belonged to the king in case the chief indulged. Sometimes witches were brought to live with the king in Vugha, and other times they ran away to find safety there. At Vugha, there resided witches, thieves, and slaves who served as the king's standing army.

The decree allowing anyone to seek sanctuary at Vugha led to an expansion of the standing army. Seeking shelter in a town meant that the chief of that town was more powerful than the one the person was running from, according to traditional Shambaa politics. The chief one escaped could start a war to get you back if he believed he was stronger than the chief one had fled to. As a result, slaves who fled Vugha and joined the king's army tended to become even more powerful since it was the most powerful chiefdom in Usambara. Furthermore, the requirement that every resident of the Vugha region own at least one house in the town increased the king's authority. In 1857, Burton and Speke learned that Vugha had 3,000 residents.

There was never a chief whose council members were Kilindi. Since commoners occupied every position of power within the chiefdom, a lot of emphasis is placed on the democratic aspect of the monarchy. However, the chief had the power to remove and replace officials at will, while the officials were powerless to remove the chief. In the event that the local chief was the king's son, the people in a minor chiefdom could turn to him. If the chief misbehaved, his father would issue a warning or possibly remove him. They could then file a complaint in Vugha.

The Shambaa king was served by a council of commoners. He alone held the power to determine life and death. He possessed the power to take both females without bridewealth and things without paying for them. He gathered tribute and distributed it to his agents. Only he had mastered the art of producing rain. At his official coronation, the people screamed out, "You are our King, but if you don't treat us right, we will get rid of you." However, without him, there would be no distinction between Shambaa and stranger, hill and plain, farm and forest, or civic society. Intercultural mingling produced the Shambaa's monarchy, which represented the apex of Bantu-speaking Tanganyika's civilization.

Following Mbegha's demise, his son Bughe ascended to the throne and ended the Nango chief's authority in Shume. However, Bughe also married a Nango, who happened to be the mother of the heir apparent. Probably around this time, the Nango and the government worked out a general accommodation. Within the chiefdom of Bumbuli, the local headmen are comparatively autonomous because the chief is typically a young man aspiring to be king. Typically, the heir at Bumbuli is too young and inexperienced to exercise strong authority. Furthermore, it is prohibited for the Kilindi to enter certain towns in Nango. The king is not allowed to go inside the Nango towns of Tekwa and Wena, not even for food, save on one unique occasion. A woman by the name of Mboza Mamwinu was the oldest. Bumbuli chiefdom, who was the mother of the heir apparent. Bughe had three children of political significance.

The eldest was a woman named Mboza Mamwinu. Maghembe, the Mulungui chief, was the next, and her full brother. The next was the heir apparent, Kinyashi of Bumbuli, who was the great wife of Nango. Following Bughe is demise, Mboza Mamwinu arrived in Vugha and demanded that Maghembe take the throne. She was supported by the Vugha people, who feared this strong woman. But Kinyashi was crowned king because the Nango of Bumbuli exerted too much pressure. Upon discovering that, Mboza Mamwinu became enraged, left Vugha, located Maghembe, and fled to the unreachable Mshihwi with him. Mshihwi was repeatedly attacked by Kinyashi's forces, but it remained unassailable. From this point on, Maghembe and his ancestors controlled a fully autonomous Kilindi kingdom in Mshihwi. Consequently, Usambara saw the rise of a second monarch, one who had the authority to execute his subjects. When the Germans arrived, the kingdom of Mshihwi was still intact.

From the beginning of his conflicts with Mshihwi, Kinyashi ruled through war. "Kinyashi, the lone wanderer" was his name in Shambaa. The Zigua war was his most recent conflict. From Vuga, Kinyashi desired to expand his dominion southward across the Pangani. In Vugha, he died. One heartwarming tale concerns Kivava, the king's friend, who was devastated to see the dead king and could not bear to go back to Vugha, where he would never be welcome at his heir's court. Kivava killed himself by taunting the Zigua warriors, and his body lay next to that of his friend and king. The kingdom of the Shambaa comprised large parts of Pare to the west and Bonde to the east of Usambara in the nineteenth century.

The reason the kingdom did not spread further south, where Kilindi power was much closer than it was at Bonde or Pare, is not easily explained. It is possible that the Zigua killed Kinyashi, the warrior king, and thus permanently gained their independence. Furthermore, the nineteenth-century towns along the Pangani had easy access to the new gun trade, making the conquest of Zigua even more challenging.

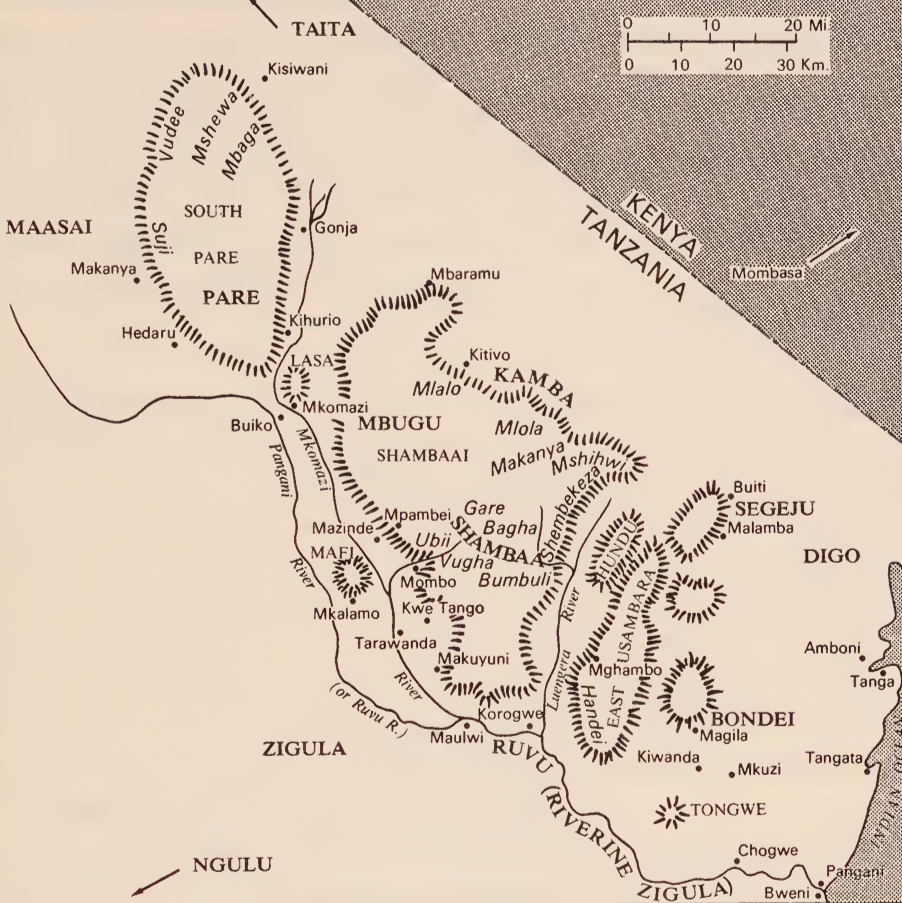
Shambaa kingdom map late 1800s

=== Decline ===
The new gun trade was the preferred methods of attacking slave traders or greedy chiefs. These took place in the northeast between the 1870s and 1880s, when the Pare of Mbaga assaulted a colony of slave traffickers at Kisiwani in the modern-day Same District and the Mbugu of Gare in Usambara killed a Kilindi leader. The Kiva insurrection of 1869, which had its roots in the breakdown of the Shambaa state spurred on by long-distance trade, was the fourth and most significant popular movement.

The insurgents were the Bondei people, who were subdued and assimilated into the Shambaa kingdom at the beginning of the nineteenth century and lived in the plains east of Usambara. The Bondei, who were formerly stateless, benefited personally from loyalty to a monarch who could settle otherwise intractable internal issues, but they received little benefit from the state. The Kilindi who were deemed too dangerous to reign in Usambara were sent to the Bondei as punishment. Being remote from the capital, the Bondei received nothing in the way of redistributed goods in exchange for the tribute demanded of them. They were considered as foreigners and not allowed to enter the town when they visited Vugha.

Kimweri ya Nyumbai, who reigned the Shambaa kingdom from approximately 1815 to 1862, brought it to its pinnacle, yet it was already under jeopardy. The lowland Zigua people obtained weapons in the 1830s, took over the Pangani valley, and posed a threat to the mountain empire. Burton stated in 1857 that "the watch-fire never leaves the mountain" and that "the war-horn is now silent." Kimweri, who ruled a conservative kingdom from a mountain capital far from the trade routes, was hesitant to see the value of firearms, but his border chiefs welcomed them and gained allies from outside the country.

Semboja, one of Kimweri's younger sons, ruled Mazinde, which is located close above the trade route, and amassed troops and supporters. When Kimweri died in 1862, the kingdom was divided. Shekulwavu, his grandson and successor, had little authority over the sub-chiefs who served as his uncles. He had an argument with his older uncle in 1868, who afterwards supported Semboja as a potential heir.

Shekulwavu's response was to ask Bondei for assistance. He is believed to have said to them, "My uncles the Kilindi of Shambalai and here in Bonde dislike me. You can drive the Kilindi from these territories if you discover that they are attacking you, subjects." Shortly after, the mercenaries of Semboia assaulted Vugha and drove Shekulwavu away. Because "we are not their subjects but Kimweri's," the Bondei pleaded with him to allow them to drive out the Kilindi. The Bondei banished all Kilindi from Bondei once he gave his consent. When Shekulwavu died, his brothers continued the legitimist cause and concocted a new scheme with the Bondei, who were worried about Kilindi retaliation.

The Kilindi were welcomed back to Bondei and promised protection, only to be slaughtered. Then the Bondei invaded Usambara, liberating slaves, killing the Kilindi, and exhorting the common people of Shambaa to rise. However, as they drew closer to Vugha, resistance grew stronger until Semboja's men eventually drove them out. Semboja was denied the throne in Usambara because his brothers wisely chose his little son because they wanted a weak ruler. Royal authority waned. Vugha was downsized to a single tiny settlement. Each chiefdom virtually became independent after a period of anarchy known locally as pato, or "rapacity."

The fight involved coastal traders and Taita, Masai, and Zigua mercenaries, just as it did in the Southern Highlands and on the western plateau. The interdependence of kings and subjects had been shattered by trade and firearms. Chiefs now relied on gunmen who bought weapons with slaves rather than tribute and spearmen. While Bumbuli, the customary chiefdom of the heir apparent, was raided by its own ruler, a Yao slave, Semboja used Maasai to raid Vugha. For twenty years, the conflict between the kin of Semboja and Shekulwavu dragged on without resolution. Both sides had weapons and some of the king's ceremonial capabilities. It was impossible to win.

As soon as the king himself died, the Bondei refused to ally themselves with Shekulwavu's faction, maintaining their independence but reverting to statelessness. Kiva had been traditionalist in motivation and destructive in action, far from having any revolutionary elements. It exemplified the constraints on long-distance trade-related political change.

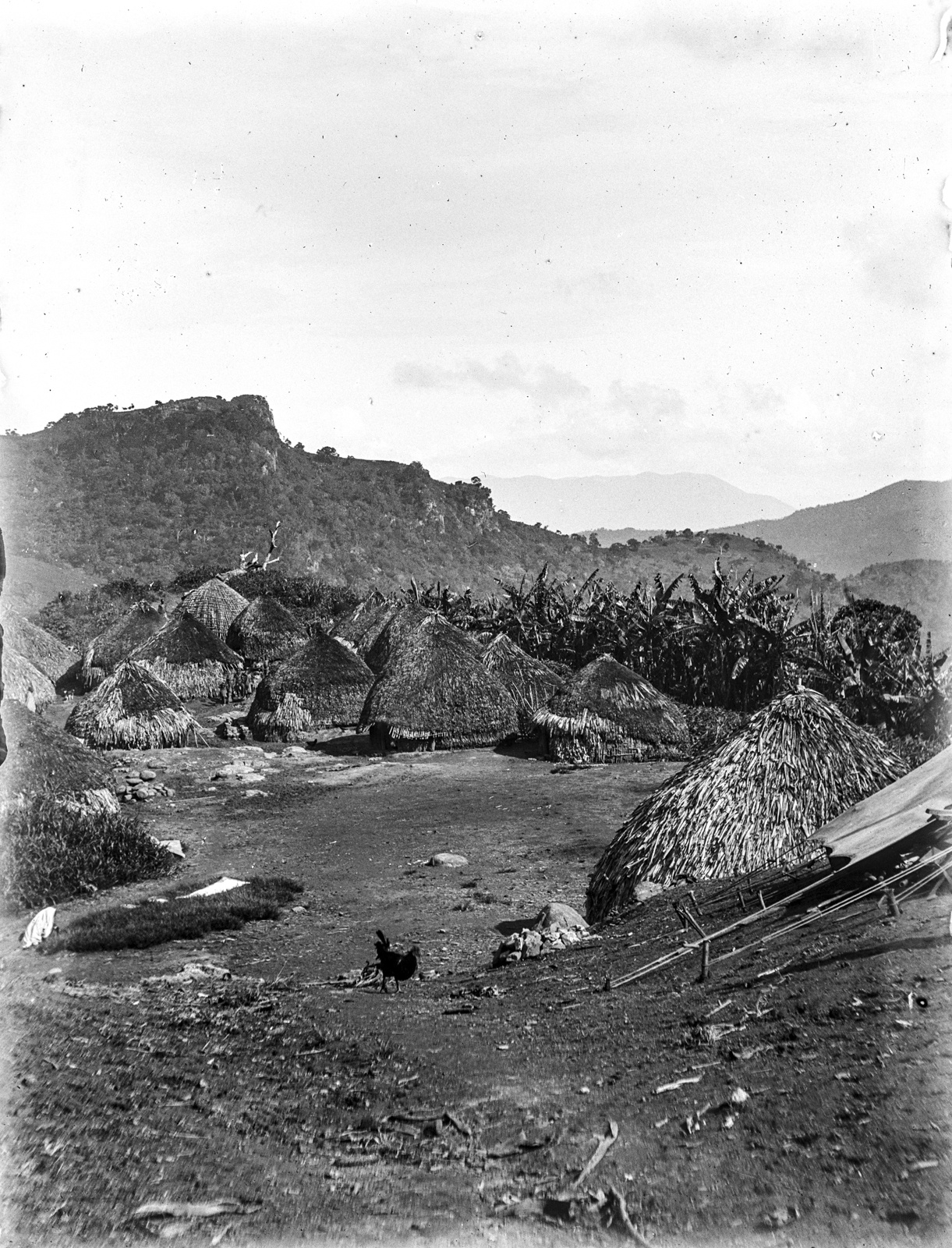
Shambaa village c.1900s. Taken by Techmer, Fritz

=== German colonial era ===
One of the most spectacular moments in Shambaa history was the Kiva Rebellion. Because Kiva was a violent popular uprising amid a world of dynastic intrigue, it was unique. Chanyeghea succeeded Shekulwavu following his death. Chanyeghea allied with the Bondei and contributed to the Kilindi's death in eastern Usambara. No doubt the Bondei had long harbored grudges against the Kilindi, the alien rulers. For Kimweri ye Nyumbai, Bonde had been far too foreign and remote to prevent his sons from misusing their position of authority. While Kilindi rule had strong indigenous roots throughout western Usambara, it seemed, as in Pare, to be an alien conquest state in Bonde. Every Kilindi that the Bondei were able to capture was killed. The Bondei went from village to village in one area on the eastern border of west Usambara, asking the Shambaa where the Kilindi were hiding and executing them if they were discovered.

Those Shambaa in this area who were not married to Kilindi betrayed the hiding places. Married relatives had loyalty to the Kilindi. It is of no doubt that very few people would have betrayed the Kilindi if the Bondei had made it to Vugha. That is to say, the benefits of royal institutions increased with proximity to the kingdom's center for commoners. The most likely revolutionaries were the Bondei, who lived on the outskirts of the kingdom.

Following the Kiva Rebellion, Bonde remained independent, the Shekulwavu survivors held east Usambara, and Semboja's followers held control of the west, including Vugha. In an effort to find allies, both sides turned to foreign politics. Shekulwaru's brother Kibanga attempted to enlist the aid of the British consul as well as missionaries to Central Africa.

As a rebel against the Sultan of Zanzibar, Mbaruk of Mombasa assisted in the invasion of Semboja's lands. In response, the Sultan supported Semboja. Slaves were sold, and both sides made money. In 1888, two notable German explorers, Baumann and Meyer, arrived on this site of sporadic fighting. Upon reaching Mazinde, Semboja learned that the German East African Company was encroaching on the coast, and an Arab by the name of Abushiri had declared war on them at Pangani. Semboja was sympathetic to Abushiri and opposed the end of the slave trade because of his significant trade connections with Pangani and his dedication to the alliance between coastal traders and inland rulers. Semboja seized 250 loads from Meyer and Baumann in favor of the Abushiri war. Due to Baumann's significant influence, Semboja was perceived by the Germans as an enemy as well as a bandit.

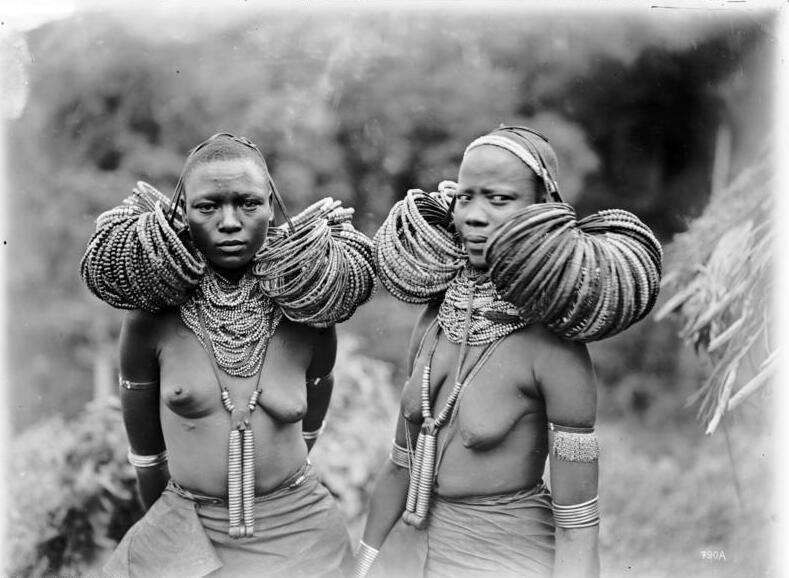
Shambaa women during the German occupation era

Between 1890 and 1895, there was little to no communication between the Germans and the Shambaa. The Germans established a station at Mazinde and took mostly in ivory as payment for the loads they had stolen. Semboja had no desire to fight after realizing that the Germans had vanquished Abushiri. The Germans restrained his son Kimweri, the king at Vugha, from making war.

Wissmann left Pangani in 1891 to impose German dominance over the northern trade route. He encountered little resistance in Bonde since the Bondei had already been occupied by the Germans and were submitting their disputes to the district officer in Tanga for settlement. Wissmann discovered a more difficult scenario in Usambara. After Kimweri's passing, the core authority that did remain was with Semboja at Mazinde. In Vugha, his son Kimweri Maguvu served as a puppet monarch. Their adversaries were the Shekulwavu family members who had fled to eastern Usambara, including his brother Kibanga and son Kinyashi.

In 1885, Kimweri signed a deal with a German agent; Semboja declined. Though Wissmann's activities convinced him otherwise, he had previously shown sympathies for the coastal resistance. In an effort to better confront the Germans, he attempted to come to terms with Kibanga, but Kibanga rejected him in the hopes of winning back Vugha. Semboja advised the other Kilindi to comply as a result. In February 1890, when German troops arrived in Mazinde, Semboja consented to hoist their flag. The Germans then acknowledged Semboja's control over West Usambara and the caravan route in an effort to preserve the trading route. The arrangement was confirmed by Wiss-mann when he arrived at Mazinde. However, Usambara's power struggle persisted after he left. Selling large portions of eastern Usambara to German planters, Kibanga established his goodwill.

Germans with clout sought to degrade Semboja, but the government chose to wait. Local officials attempted to establish Kinyashi after Kimweri's death in 1893, but Semboja protested, so another of his sons, Mputa, was recognized. Semboja died at last in March 1895. The man there and then took advantage of the situation to hang Mputa. After much deliberation—out of concern for his father's future—Kinyashi finally acceded to the throne in September 1895. Due to their patience and willingness to wait, the Germans were able to annex Usambara without firing a shot, reversing the outcome of the Shambaa civil war. Early in 1891, as Wissmann marched forward from Mazinde, he recognized Semboja's candidates as chiefs of the Shamba villages beneath the Pare mountains, although Pare occupied the majority of his time.

The German station chief believed that Usambara should be left alone in order to achieve peace in other areas of the Protect The Lutheran mission in Usambara produced some of its most important and persuasive work during this time because the church was still relying solely on moral force during this early era, alone.

Beginning in 1895, Shambaa society suffered a quick series of disasters, and within five years its foundations were shaken. It all began in March 1895, when Semboja died a natural death. The Germans, by waiting, had eliminated the need to conquer Usambara by force. As soon as Semboja was dead his arms were confiscated.

A small cannon, 1,300 pounds of gunpowder, and 27 breechloaders were taken by the Germans. They were going to conquer the Kilindi in less than a month. In front of all the Kilindi chiefs, they accomplished this by hanging the king. Mputa, the son of Semboja, was now the king at Vugha. He learned that one of the king's wives had been taken in by a commoner who had broken into the royal village. Mputa executed the guilty man, following the only path a Shambaa king could take. The Usambara king was hanged at Mazinde after his enemies reported the incident.

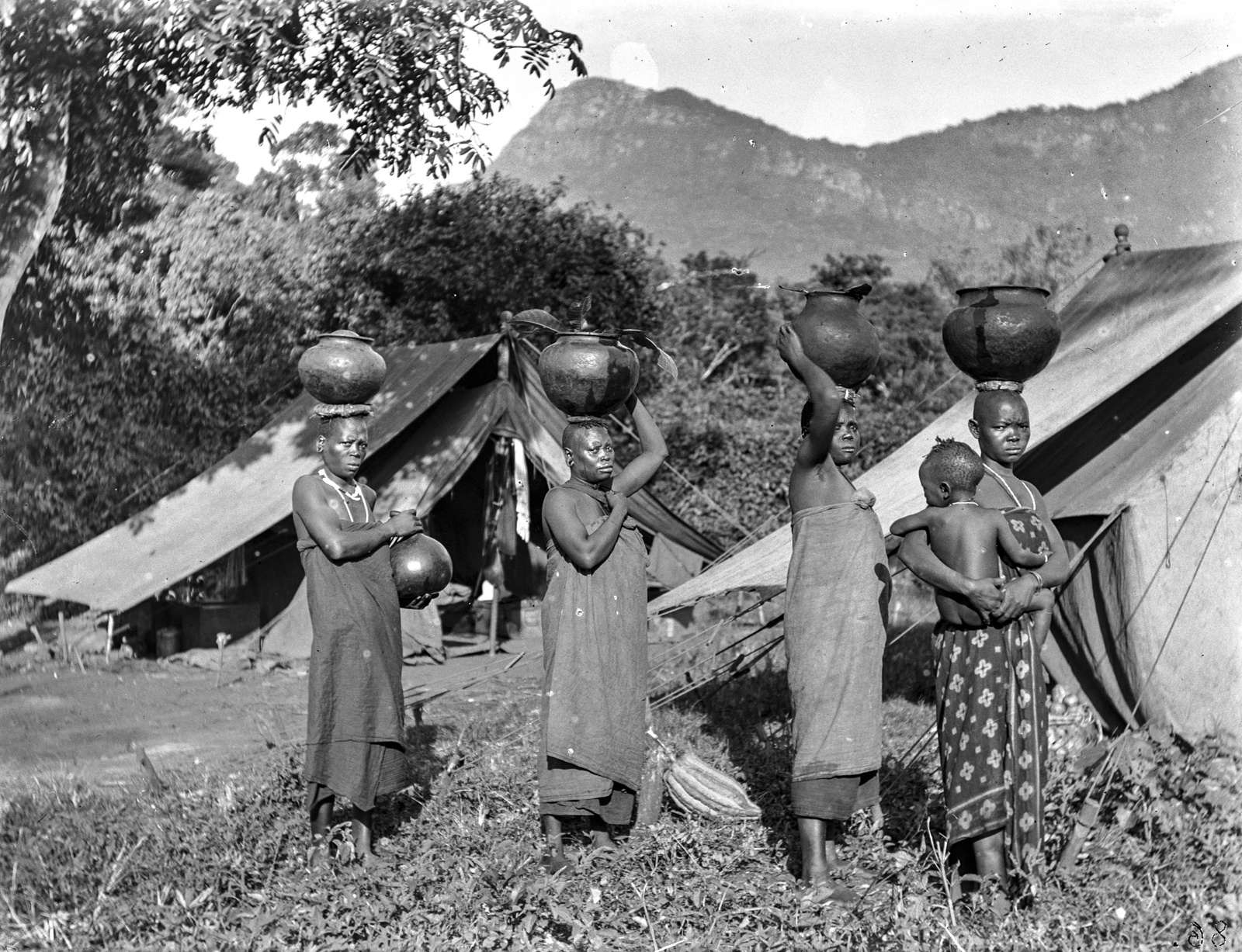
Shambaa women c. 1900. Taken by Techmer, Fritz

To witness the hanging, every Kilindi chief in Usambara had been called. A sick and elderly Kilindi from a far-off chiefdom was transported all the way to Mazinde to witness the execution. The German reaction to a political principle of the Shambaa was as follows: "The king does not step aside; he is removed only by death."

The Shambaa were no longer in charge of their own fate following Mputa's passing. Kinyashi, the son of Shekulwavu, was brought from East Usambara following a short break. He was only put in place to serve as a labor recruiter for German plantations, and since the Germans installed him, he has never really held any authority.

Kinyashi began taking payment in 1896 for his labor deliveries. A missionary heard the Vugha women remark, "Where once a lion sat, there is now a pig," in July 1896. In 1898 jiggers appeared on a large scale for the first time. Many thousands perished, and the majority of people think that Europeans brought this plague to torment the Shambaa. A catastrophic famine struck Usambara in 1899. To satisfy their hunger, many ate banana peels and tree roots; hundreds of them converted to Christianity.

Smallpox and slave trading contributed to the disintegration of the kingdom, and in 1898 a fire destroyed Vuga. The Germans took control. Under colonial rule the dynasty continued to have some authority, but in 1962 the Tanzanian government removed all power from the hereditary chiefdoms. Kimweri ye Nyumbai's descendant Kimweri Mputa Magogo (died 2000) was the last Lion King.

The sub-chief of Mlalo, who had achieved nearly sovereignty during the instability of pato, welcomed Bethel missionaries to Usambara. It was noted that "Rev. Doring" prayed for peace in Ushambaa, an increase in population, and the independence of Mlalo. In contrast, the missionaries were led back to Mlalo by the monarch after their visit to Vugha. Of the 867 Lutherans who had been baptized in Usambara by 1906, Mlalo had 468. A ritual authority gave Shambaa kings a lot of power, and the character of preexisting religious organizations affected how people generally reacted to Christianity.

Half of Vugha burned in 1898, and the other half burned in 1902. The town had burned down several times before and been rebuilt, but this time no one bothered to build anything new. The town vanished. At the start of the new century, the Shambaa believed they had been defeated.

The Usambara area was the early colonial headquarters for German East Africa during the hot season. Tanganyika, the name for the German colony, and later for the republic and eventually for the mainland portion of Tanzania is itself from Sambaa: Tanga means farmed land, and nyika is brushy land.

== Agriculture ==
The Banana (Musa sp.) was historically the most significant food source in the Usambara mountains before the arrival of the Europeans in the 19th century. The first known European to visit Usambara was the missionary Johann Krapff, who made observations in 1848 and 1850 about the growing of bananas and their use in trade. The enormous, luxuriant fields of the crop found in Usambara equally delighted Krapf's colleague J. J. Erhardt, who visited the region in 1853, and the explorers Burton and Speke, who arrived in 1857. When visiting in 1867, an Anglican missionary said, "I don't suppose I've ever seen so many bananas growing everywhere around Vuga. They are then dried and ground into a kind of cake by the people. They almost depend on them".

After 1891, German missionaries settled permanently in the mountains; according to their estimates, banana cultivation accounted for up to 45% of all arable ground in the early 1890s. According to legend, the slopes surrounding the main town areas were covered in banana forests. Early travelers to Usambara also supplied details on other ingredients. In addition to bananas, the Shambaa cultivated maize (Zea mays), taro (Colocasia esculentum), various types of beans (including Phaseolus sp. Cajanus sp., and Vigna sp.), cucurbits (Cucurbita sp.), millet (Pennisetum typho-ides), sorghum (Sorghum vulgare), sugar cane (Saccharum sp.), yams (Dioscorea sp.), and sweet potatoes (Ipomoea batatas).

The highlands had a diverse range of crops, both generally and in specific fields, and the Shambaa were aware of numerous regional variants within certain species or botanical groups. Although cassava was reportedly known in Zanzibar in 1799, it had little impact on early Shambaa agriculture. The leaves were reportedly consumed more frequently than the tuber itself, and it was only occasionally grown on poorer soils.

Usambara before colonial times was often a location of surplus productivity. Food was traded through a network of native markets connecting the agroecological zones of the plains and mountains, and Shambaa also coordinated a significant caravan trade to coastal population centers. There is no evidence that bananas have ever been exported, but maize, beans, and sweet potatoes in particular were cultivated in excess of local demand and subsequently sold outside the highlands. This low-value, high-bulk commodity's transportation challenges were undoubtedly a major factor. There is no proof that the rulers of the Shambaa state regulated or even had an interest in the extra-regional commerce in foodstuffs, with the exception of modest fees levied at some of the bigger marketplaces.

However, the Shambaa Supremacy in northern Tanzania prior to 1900 played a significant role in the large-scale food trade. The entire region between Usambara and the seaside was governed by one governmental system, weak though it was. It is unlikely that Shambaa growers could have organized commercial caravans from the mountains to the sea had other factors been in play.

The emergence of the European powers had no impact on this regional trading pattern. Usambara was regarded as the "breadbasket" of northeastern Tanzania from the entrance of the Europeans until the late 1930s. While thousands of African sisal estate workers in the Pangani River Valley relied on Usambara corn and beans for their daily needs, the highland food helped supply urban enclaves at Tanga and Mombasa. Most Shambaa prefer to produce maize for their own consumption and for sale to foreign natives employed in the area, so they were notoriously unwilling to engage in wage labor employment as a means of earning money to pay colonially imposed taxes. For many, there were less revolting and disruptive alternatives.

Administrators had the policy of discouraging any move toward commercial cultivation of non-food crops by African cultivators in the highlands throughout German authority and for the first ten years of British rule. This policy, for the most part, supported the Shambaa's preferences. Even after 1930, when coffee and other cash crops started to interest the populace and the government, between 15 and 20 tons of potatoes (Solanum tuberosum) and comparable amounts of maize and beans were still exported by train from Usambara each month.

During the 1920s and 1930s, a small group of European farmers who grew the same commodities but in smaller amounts often handled the marketing. For potatoes, vegetables, and other crops, the Europeans developed informal out-grower networks and charged for their services as middlemen and bulkers. There is no documentation of the amount of food that was transported by lorry or in headloads out of the mountains, but we may be sure that rail export made up a small portion of all area exports.

In precolonial Usambara, the Shambaa people lived mostly in the areas surrounding Vuga, Bumbuli, and Mlalo. It is no accident that these are also the regions best suited for growing bananas. Bananas require approximately 4 inches of rainfall per month and thrive best when mean monthly temperatures do not deviate much from 80 °F, in addition to the permeable soil that is practically universal in the highlands. These circumstances exist naturally in Bumbuli, although at relatively drier Vuga and Mlalo, large irrigation works were necessary to hydrate the banana groves. The steep, chilly, and dry interior portions of the mountains were not at all suitable for traditional Shambaa farming.

Round potatoes have become a mainstay, allowing Shambaa cultivators to move beyond the crowded regions of Mlalo, Vuga, and Bumbuli and into regions that were previously unfeasible or marginal for highland agriculture centered on bananas. The potato was able to take over the agricultural and dietary role that the banana held in warmer regions in the interior and up north. It is reasonable to draw the conclusion that factors such as population pressure, agricultural suitability, and nutritional similarities contributed to the quickening of the transition to a new cultigen that would not have been so well received otherwise.

It is true that the sweet potato (Ipomoea batatas), a crop suitable for interior regions, was already available to the Shambaa. There is proof that this plant was widely planted before 1900 in the very places where the round potato was later enthusiastically embraced, including the Mtae ridge.

Cassava was not particularly important to Usambara before contact. Bananas were the main staple food, followed closely by maize, sweet potatoes, and yams. But in the years following World War 1, cassava started to gain more popularity. The crop was being strongly promoted by the government as a famine reserve by the 1930s, and it is noteworthy to note that there is no indication in Usambara that farmers were reluctant to produce it. By contrast, in the adjoining plains communities of Korogwe and Handeni district police encountered varying degrees of hostility and apathy in their attempts to force residents to produce the crop. Cassava planting was never a problem in Usambara later on.

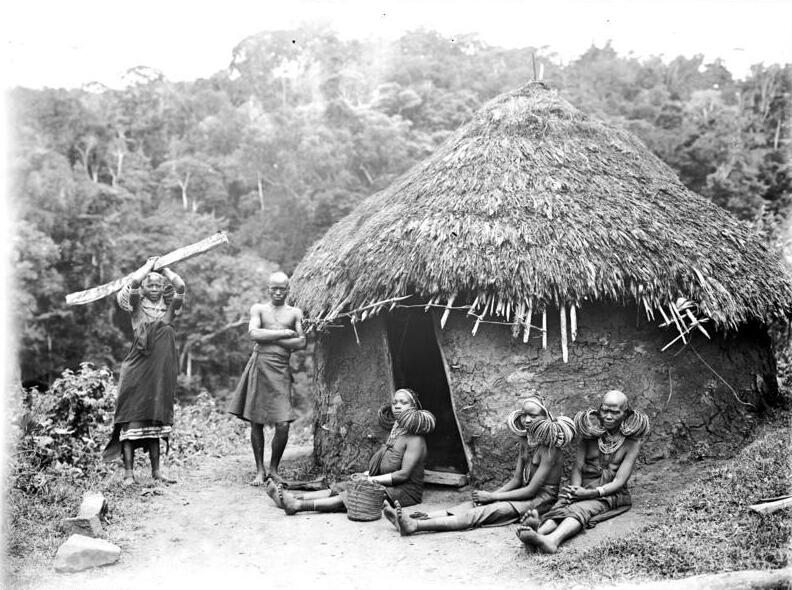
Bundesarchiv Bild 105-DOA0786, Deutsch-Ostafrika, Waschambaa vor Hütte
