= Justus Perthes (publishing company) =

German publisher

Justus Perthes Geographische Anstalt Gotha
- Parent company: Ernst Klett Verlag GmbH
- Status: Defunct
- Founded: 1785 (in Gotha); 1953 (in Darmstadt)
- Founder: Justus Perthes (Gotha); Dr. Joachim Justus Perthes (Darmstadt)
- Defunct: 1953 (in Gotha); 1992 (in Darmstadt)
- Successor: VEB Hermann Haack Geographisch-Kartographische Anstalt Gotha; Geographische Verlagsanstalt Justus Perthes Darmstadt
- Country of origin: Germany
- Headquarters location: Gotha (1785-1953; 2016); Darmstadt (1953-1992)
- Distribution: Worldwide
- Nonfiction topics: Atlases, maps, almanacs

Justus Perthes Publishers (German: Justus Perthes Verlag) was established in 1785 in Gotha, Germany. Justus Perthes was primarily a publisher of geographical and historical atlases and educational wall maps. They published the Almanach de Gotha (German Gothaischer Genealogischer Hofkalender) from 1785 to 1944, and Petermanns Geographische Mitteilungen from 1855 to 2004. In 2016 the publisher was dissolved.

== Almanacs ==
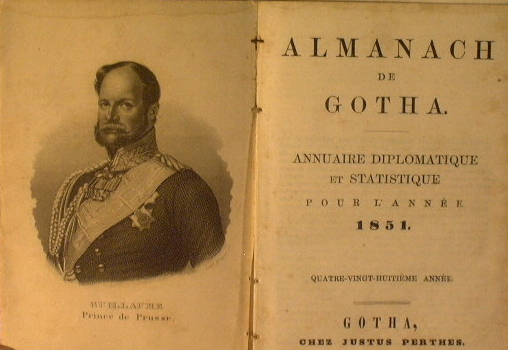
Almanach de Gotha, 1851

In 1778, Johann Georg Justus Perthes worked as a bookseller in Gotha. He founded the publishing firm Justus Perthes in September 1785, when he got a fifteen-year lease to publish the Almanach de Gotha, an annual French-language compilation of statistics on nations of the world. This almanac was published from 1763 to 1777 by Carl Wilhelm Ettinger in Gotha. It was only after the second 15-year lease in 1816 that the almanac was published with the Perthes publishing house imprint. The publication of the almanac as a Justus Perthes publication ceased in 1944.

In later years, Perthes published other sets of almanacs in the German language:

- Gothaisches genealogisches Taschenbuch der gräflichen Häuser(1825–1941)
- Gothaisches genealogisches Taschenbuch der freiherrlichen Häuser (1848–1942)
- Gothaisches genealogisches Taschenbuch der uradeligen Häuser (1900–1919)
- Gothaisches genealogisches Taschenbuch der briefadeligen Häuser (1907–1919).

Updating the almanacs required a lot of documentation and data collection, which was good preparation for later geographical publications. In 1911, these documents were added to Perthes' library, ‘Bücherei der Geographischen Anstalt von Justus Perthes,’ which already contained many maps and geographical publications. After the Second World War, the Soviet army destroyed the almanac archives to prevent claims of the House of Romanov on the tsarist's throne.

== Atlases ==
=== Stieler's Hand-Atlas ===
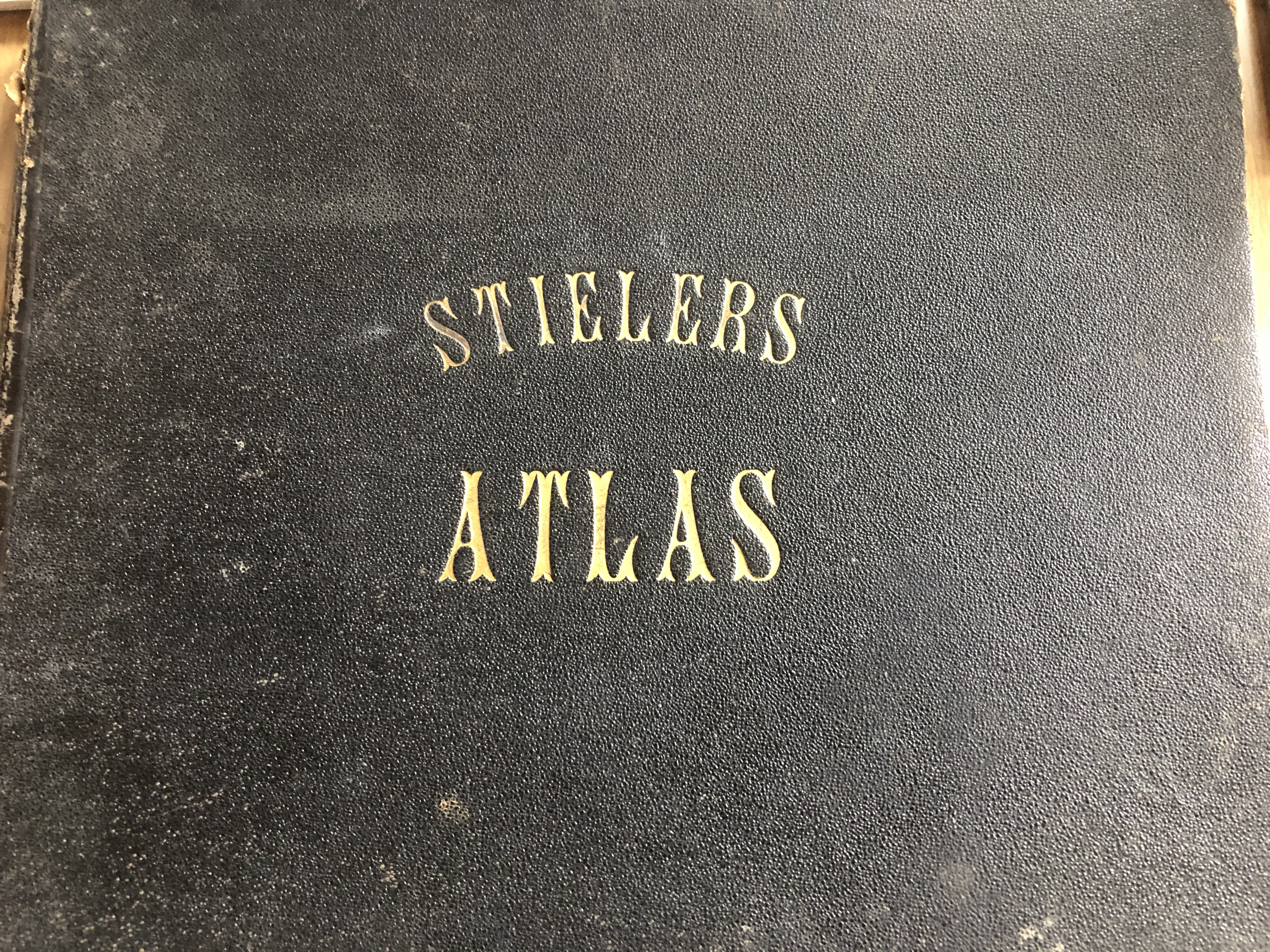
Stielers Atlas, 1880

From 1790 onwards, Perthes enlarged his publisher's list with obituary lists, histories, the circumnavigation of the earth by Antonio Pigafetta and the life history of Martin Behaim. In 1814, he was joined by his son Wilhelm Perthes (1793–1853) who had been in the publishing house of Justus's nephew Friedrich Christoph Perthes at Hamburg. In 1816, on Johann Georg Justus' death in Gotha, Wilhelm took over the firm and laid the foundation of the geographical branch of the business.

In 1801, the company published its first geographical book with a map of Germany by Adolf Stieler. In 1809 they published their first atlas, but with the changing political and administrative boundaries due to the Napoleonic wars meant that it was not a financial success. Perthes was not daunted, and soon agreed to a proposal by Adolf Stieler to publish Stielers Handatlas. Stieler proposed to create the atlas together with Christian Gottlieb Reichard (1758–1837), who later drafted part of the maps. Before the first issue of the atlas could be distributed in 1816, Perthes died and was succeeded by his then 23-year-old son Wilhelm Perthes.

As with many publications in that era, the Stieler was published in issues. In 1823, the preliminary edition in 4 issues was completed, with 50 maps. This model was a success, and demand for the atlas outstripped supply. The relatively small size of 35 cm × 29 cm (14 in × 11 in), made it quite handy. Most maps used scales of 1:3,700,000, 1:925,000 and 1:850,000. Stieler used the French toise as the basic unit of scale.

The original plan was that the first edition of the atlas would be accompanied by a textbook. This was only published, however, in 1840-1846. While the preliminary edition was still being published, Friedrich von Stülpnagel (1786–1865), who also was responsible for the 2nd and 3rd edition, was already revising the maps for the next edition. The first official edition of 1833 contained 75 maps. Through the years, the number of maps increased, and the final edition of 1925-1945 contained 254 main and auxiliary maps on 188 leaves.

- Preliminary: Hand-Atlas über alle Theile der Erde nach dem neuesten Zustande und über das Weltgebäude, 1816–1833, 50-75 maps (Adolf Stieler & Heinrich Berghaus)
- 1st ed.: Stieler's Hand-Atlas über alle Theile der Erde und über das Weltgebäude, 1834–1845, 75-83 maps. (Adolf Stieler & Friedrich von Stülpnagel)
- 2nd ed.: Stieler's Hand-Atlas über alle Theile der Erde und über das Weltgebäude, 1846–1852, 83 maps (Friedrich von Stülpnagel)
- 3rd ed.: Stieler's Hand-Atlas über alle Theile der Erde und über das Weltgebäude, 1853–1862, 83-84 maps (Friedrich von Stülpnagel)
- 4th ed.: Stieler's Hand-Atlas über alle Theile der Erde und über das Weltgebäude, 1863–1867, 84 maps (August Petermann)
- 5th ed.: Hand-Atlas über alle Theile der Erde und über das Weltgebäude, 1868–1874, 84 maps (August Petermann)
- 6th ed.: Hand-Atlas über alle Theile der Erde und über das Weltgebäude, 1875–1881, 90 maps (Hermann Berghaus & Carl Vogel)
- 7th ed.: Adolf Stieler's Hand Atlas über alle Theile der Erde und über das Weltgebäude, 1882–1889, 95 maps (Hermann Berghaus & Carl Vogel)
- 8th. Ed.: Adolf Stieler's Hand Atlas über alle Theile der Erde und über das Weltgebäude, 1890–1902, 95 maps (Alexander Supan)
- 9th ed.: Stielers Hand-Atlas, 1905–1924, 100 maps (Hermann Haack)
- 10th ed.: Stielers Hand-Atlas, 1925–1945, 108 maps (Hermann Haack)
- International ed.: Stieler grand atlas de géographie moderne, 1934–1940, 84 maps (Hermann Haack)

From 1821 onwards the Stieler was also published as a school atlas, and by 1914 93 German and foreign editions of the school atlas had been published. In later years the Stieler would be the basis for many other Perthes publications, such as Stielers Schulatlas der alten Welt (23 editions 1824-1852). In addition to the International edition (1934-1941) of the big Stieler from 1851 onwards at least 12 foreign editions were published in the United States and other European countries.

Shortly after Stieler's death in 1836, Perthes posthumously published his 25-part map of Germany and surrounding countries at a scale of 1:740,000. This was the first mid-scale map of Germany that was marketed by a private firm, where an official large scale map was converted into an easy-to-use reference and travel map. This publication met with such a great demand that several editions were published up to the Second World War. Shortly after the death of Stieler, his map collection was bought by Perthes and added to the company library.

In 1902, J.G. Bartholomew wrote: "No other private firm has ever been associated with so many distinguished geographers and cartographers, or rendered such great services to geographical science by its high-class works as Justus Perthes of Gotha".

=== Berghaus's physikalischer Atlas ===
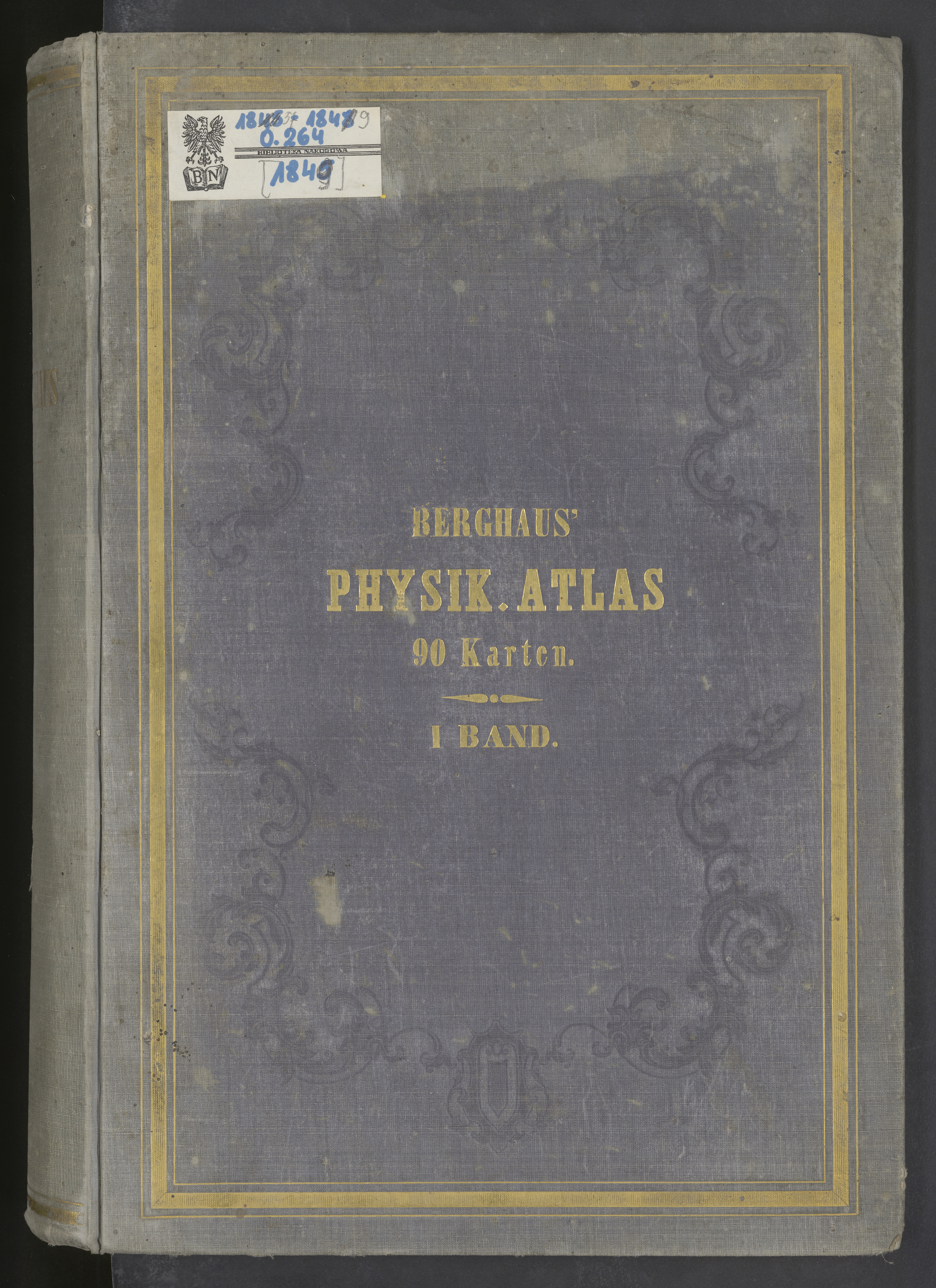
Heinrich Berghaus Physikalischer Atlas, 1849

Between 1833 and 1837 Heinrich Berghaus created the Atlas von Asien. It was meant as the first part of the never realized project titled Große Atlas der außereuropäischen Erdteile. The publication not only resulted in the enormous loss of 5,240 Reichsthaler, but also in everlasting fame. As Bernhard Perthes, fourth generation publisher, wrote in 1885: "While the direct profit was absolutely nothing – yes, even worse than that, the firm had to carry this failure for many years - the indirect profit was immense. The Atlas von Asien made Justus Perthes at one time world-famous".

The next big project for the firm was the Physikalischer Atlas (transl. Physical atlas) of Heinrich Berghaus. This first thematic world atlas (with issues covering meteorology, hydrography, geology, magnetism, plant geography, animal geography, anthropology, and ethnography) was published as a complement for the 5-volume work Kosmos by Alexander von Humboldt. Heinrich Berghaus edited the first two editions himself, while his nephew Hermann Berghaus edited the third edition. Von Humboldt provided Berghaus with data that he had acquired during his explorations and Berghaus processed these into physical maps, for which he used many kinds of isolines and a whole range of new symbols. He liked to project thematic content on top of topographic maps, and was very interested in the correct depiction of heights. Some maps of the first edition carry the signature "drawn and engraved in the ‘Geographische Kunstschule’ (transl. Geographic Art School) at Potsdam". Between 1839 and 1844 Berghaus tutored there, amongst others, August Petermann, Heinrich 'Henry' Lange and his nephew Hermann Berghaus. As compensation, the pupils had to edit amongst others maps for the Stieler and the Physikalischer Atlas. This happened with map 2 from issue 2 of the second edition of the Physikalischer Atlas (Hydrography) which shows, among other things, the discovery by Von Humboldt that the river Casiquiare was the watershed between the rivers Orinoco and Rio Negro. In 1850 the big atlas was converted into a school atlas. This first thematic atlas had such a great influence in its time that the publisher Alexander Keith Johnston requested Berghaus to make some maps for the first part of his Physical atlas of natural phenomena. Though Berghaus did not find the British scientific climate ripe enough for such publications he complied. His criticism was repeated half a century later by J.G. Bartholomew, who declared that British contributions to the geographic sciences mainly lay in ‘search’, while the German contributions mainly lay in ‘research’. For the second part of his atlas Johnston required the cooperation of Heinrich Lange and August Petermann, who both moved to Scotland, in 1844 and 1845 respectively.

Between 1850 and 1852 Berghaus published four issues of the Geographisches Jahrbuch, that were meant as supplements on several of the Perthes’ atlases. In 1854 the editorship of these annuals was taken over by his former pupil Petermann. This, plus the fact that his son August was not engaged by Perthes in 1854, made Berghaus decide to break off his relationship with the publisher.

- 1e ed.: Dr. Heinrich Berghaus' Physikalischer Atlas oder Sammlung von Karten, auf denen die hauptsächlichsten Erscheinungen der anorganischen und organischen Natur nach ihrer geographischen Verbreitung und Vertheilung bildlich dargestellt sind, 1837–1848, 90 maps
- 2e ed.: Dr. Heinrich Berghaus' Physikalischer Atlas, Sammlung von 93 Karten, auf denen die hauptsächlichsten Erscheinungen der anorganischen und organischen Natur nach ihren geographischen Verbreitung und Vertheilung bildlich dargestellt sind, 1849–1863, 93 maps
- 3e ed.: Berghaus' Physikalischer Atlas, 1886–1892, 75 maps

=== Spruner's historisch-geographischen Hand-Atlas ===
In 1838 Perthes added the Historischer Atlas von Bayern by Karl Spruner von Merz (1803-1892) to his publishing list. This was soon followed by the Historisch-Geographischen Hand-Atlas (ed. 1869), published between 1848 and 1853. To make comparison easier with the Stieler the same scales were used as much as possible. Heinrich Theodor Menke edited many maps for the second and third (1909) editions. Foreign editions were published in London, Turin and New York.

=== Von Sydow's Methodischer Schulatlas ===
While teaching at the Erfurt military school Emil von Sydow (1812-1873) was taken up by the problems of how to improve geographical educational. Eventually he ended up with Perthes, and a plan to publish a series of wallmaps. While cartographers like Friedrich von Stülpnagel and Christian Bär drew the outlines for the maps, Sydow painted in the colours green for lowlands and brown-red for higher areas, a system still in use today. When Carl Ritter saw the first map Asia he was very much taken with how it was decluttered from redundant toponyms and the way it was coloured. When Von Sydow's wallmap series in the 20th century was replaced by the series developed by Hermann Haack, the latter emphasized red for higher mountainous areas.

As a follow-up to Stielers Schulatlas, von Sydow created the E. von Sydows Methodischer Schulatlas. From 1879 to 1943 this was published as the Sydow-Wagners Methodischer Schulatlas. To emphasize the contrast between text and atlas when describing landscapes he wrote in his introduction: "Even when text has to divide the subject of geography in several parts and to isolate it for systematic education in independent levels, it is preferably the task of the map to neutralize this division and to fuse the independent parts together into a wholeness".

Von Sydow spent most of his energy editing the Der kartographische Standpunkt Europas (transl. Cartographical review of Europe), that was published twelve times between 1857 and 1872 in Petermanns Geographische Mitteilungen and contained 357 pages in total.

=== Petermanns Geographische Mitteilungen ===
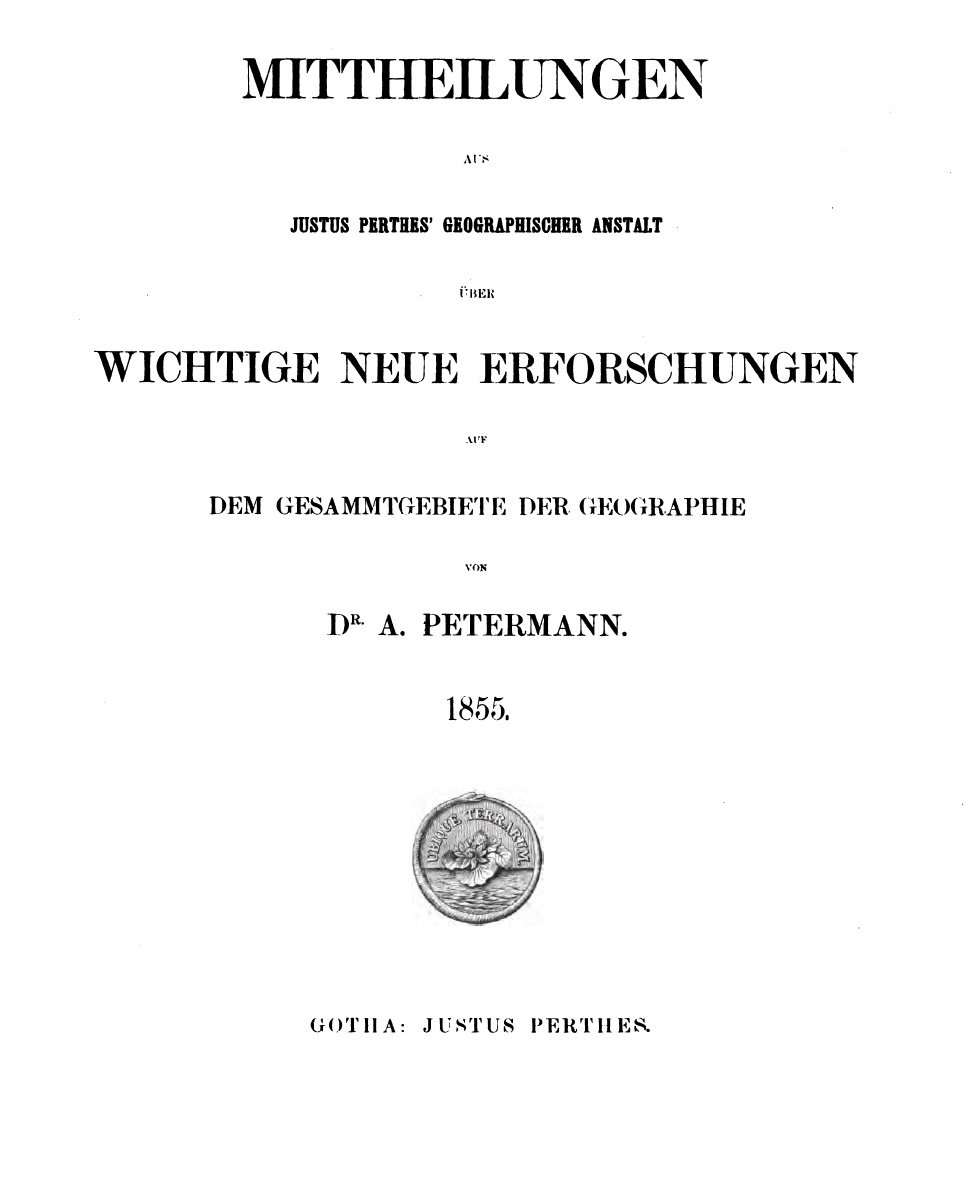
Mittheilungen aus Justus Perthes' geographischer Anstalt über wichtige neue Erforschungen auf dem Gesammtgebiete der Geographie, 1855

Between 1839 and 1844 August Heinrich Petermann (1822–1878) was trained by Heinrich Berghaus. Before he started working with Perthes, Petermann worked in 1845–46 in Scotland on the Physical Atlas, published by Alexander Keith Johnston and in 1847 moved to London. There he founded his own establishment in 1850. He was very active in the Royal Geographical Society, which honoured him in 1868 with the Founder's Medal. In London he met with many geographers and explorers, a task which was made easier because he was fluent in German, French and English. Forced by private worries in 1854 he complied with a request by Bernhardt Perthes (1824–1857) to work for his firm. Shortly after his move to Gotha the Duke of Gotha appointed him Professor in 1854. In 1855 he was given an honorary Doctorate at the University of Göttingen.

It was intended that Petermann would continue the Geographisches Jahrbuch. But at the intercession of Adolph Müller, who from 1857 onwards managed the firm of Perthes, in 1855 he started the journal Mittheilungen aus Justus Perthes' Geographischer Anstalt über wichtige neue Erforschungen auf der Gesammtgebiet der Geographie von Dr. A. Petermann. After his death in 1878, this was renamed Petermanns Geographische Mitteilungen (PGM). The promise, made in the first issue, that every issue of this journal would at least contain one map was kept till the journal ceased to appear in 2004. In the same introduction to the journal it is said that PGM was meant as being supplementary to the Stieler and other Perthes atlases. PGM started in March 1855 with a print run of 4,000 copies, with 1,000 subscriptions abroad. As so much information was coming into Gotha which could not be published in the 40-page issues of PGM it was decided to start publishing the Ergänzungshefte [Supplementary issues]. The first supplementary issues, published from 1860, were only small booklets but they soon became hefty books. The last supplementary issue (number 294) was published in 1999. 10-year cumulative indexes for PGM were published, along with index maps for all maps contained in PGM in the respective periods.

PGM became known for its fast publishing of reports from explorers, often accompanied by up-to-date maps. PGM not only published explorers' reports, but also was proactive when new explorations were called for. As an example, the Ergänzungsband II of 1863 contained the Karte von Inner-Afrika (Map of Inner Africa) in 10 parts, in which were drawn all the known routes of explorers between 1701 and 1863. The most important parts of the map, however, were the blank areas, intended to stimulate explorers to new ventures. The map was also meant to give the journal's readers the chance to keep track on the progress of explorers, and to read about the explorations in new issues of PGM. This initiative was also taken later with regard to the Northeast Passage of the Arctic Ocean.

Petermann was not only a geographer/cartographer, who could distil from many sources a realistic image of the world, but he also was a taskmaster who could transfer his skills to his pupils. These included Ernst Debes (1840–1923), Bruno Hassenstein (1839-1902), Hermann Habenicht(1844–1917), Fritz Hanemann (1847–1877), Otto Koffmahn (1851–1916), Christian Peip (1843-1922) and Arnim Welcker (1840–1888). They became known as 'Petermann's school' or the 'Gotha school'. They put the crafts and lessons that Petermann had learned with Berghaus into practise, which resulted in unmatched cartographic images. The style – map lettering, relief representation, better engraving and colouring – became more uniform and influenced all new atlas publications of Perthes.

During his time as editor Petermann received much support from Ernst Behm (1830–1884), who succeeded him after his untimely death as editor-in-chief. Following the example of The Statesman's Yearbook (1864-...) he published from 1866 onwards the first volume of the Geographisches Jahrbuch (transl. Geographical yearbook) as second complement to PGM. Sometimes the articles in PGM and the yearbook overlapped each other. The yearbook contained predominantly statistical data, that Behm circumscribed as 'estimations'. As the data resulting from censuses became so abundant it was decided that they would be published bi-annually (with maps) in PGM (14 volumes in 1872–1904, 1909,1931).

The content of PGM became more science-oriented after 1880, especially under the editorship of Alexander Supan (1847–1920), who was editor-in-chief until 1909. He introduced Literaturberichte (literature reviews), that eventually contained 24,512 reviews and bibliographic descriptions of geographical books and articles published between 1886 and 1909.

==== Chief editors PGM ====
- 1855–1878 August Petermann
- 1878–1884 Ernst Behm
- 1884–1908 Alexander Supan
- 1909–1937 Paul Langhans
- 1938–1945 Nikolaus Creutzburg
- 1948–1954 Hermann Haack
- 1954–1968 Werner Horn
- 1968–1971 Josef Wustelt
- 1972–1986 Franz Köhler
- 1987–1991 Eberhard Benser
- 1992–2004 Multiple editors-in-chief

== Hermann Haack ==
In 1897 Hermann Haack (1872–1966) took up employment with Justus Perthes. He began with the editing of school atlases and from 1907 onwards he became the main editor of the Sydow-Wagners Methodischer Schulatlas. In 1902 he became responsible for the Stieler. It was the second time that this was accompanied by a textbook. In 1934 he started on the international Stieler. For this project, a lot of maps were redrawn and toponyms were given in local language. A Dutch reviewer read the subtitle Grand atlas de géographie moderne as meaning that the atlas would be complemented with some maps in the style of the Physikalischer Atlas. Unfortunately the Second World War terminated this project before it was complete. In 1908, he began a carto-bibliographic supplement in PGM, that contained many reviews of maps. In 1941-1945 this was succeeded by the feature Kartographie.

Haack was especially renowned for the publication of his wallmap series, of which 250 items were planned. In 1903 he began with the series Große Historischer Wandatlas [Large historic wall atlas] (41 maps, 1908–1931) and in 1907 with the Großer Geographischer Wandatlas [Large geographic wall atlas] (47 maps, 1907–1930). A third series concerning physical geography was produced between 1913 and 1937, but this was not a commercial success because of the high production costs. His last grand project was the Zentralasien-Atlas [Central Asia atlas] for Sven Hedin, but because of the Second World War this project ended. Hermann Haack retired in 1944.

== The end of an era ==
=== Breakup of Justus Perthes ===
The American army occupied Thüringen in April 1945, and handed it over on July 1 to the Soviet command. Fortunately only the Almanac archives suffered from this occupation. The rest of the very large Perthes collections was left as it was. After the German partition, 'Justus Perthes Gotha' was expropriated in January 1953 by the communist GDR regime. Dr. Joachim Bernhard Justus Perthes and his son Wolf Jürgen Justus Perthes had left the GDR in late December 1952. They renewed their claim on 'Justus Perthes' in 1953 as 'Justus Perthes Geographische Verlagsanstalt Darmstadt' in Western Germany. In 1980 the management was taken over by Stephan Justus Perthes, seventh generation publisher. The publishing company in Gotha, that was then part of Eastern Germany was in 1955 renamed as 'VEB Hermann Haack Geographisch-Kartographische Anstalt Gotha'. Hermann Haack was recalled from retirement, and until his death in 1966 led the company. The company was mainly known, for its translations of school atlases and wall map series. After the unifaction of both the Germanies both publishing companies were unified again in 1992 under their old name ’Justus Perthes Verlag Gotha GmbH', later being sold by Stephan Justus Perthes to Ernst Klett Verlag Stuttgart. The publishing house remained in Gotha until March 2016.

=== Close down ===
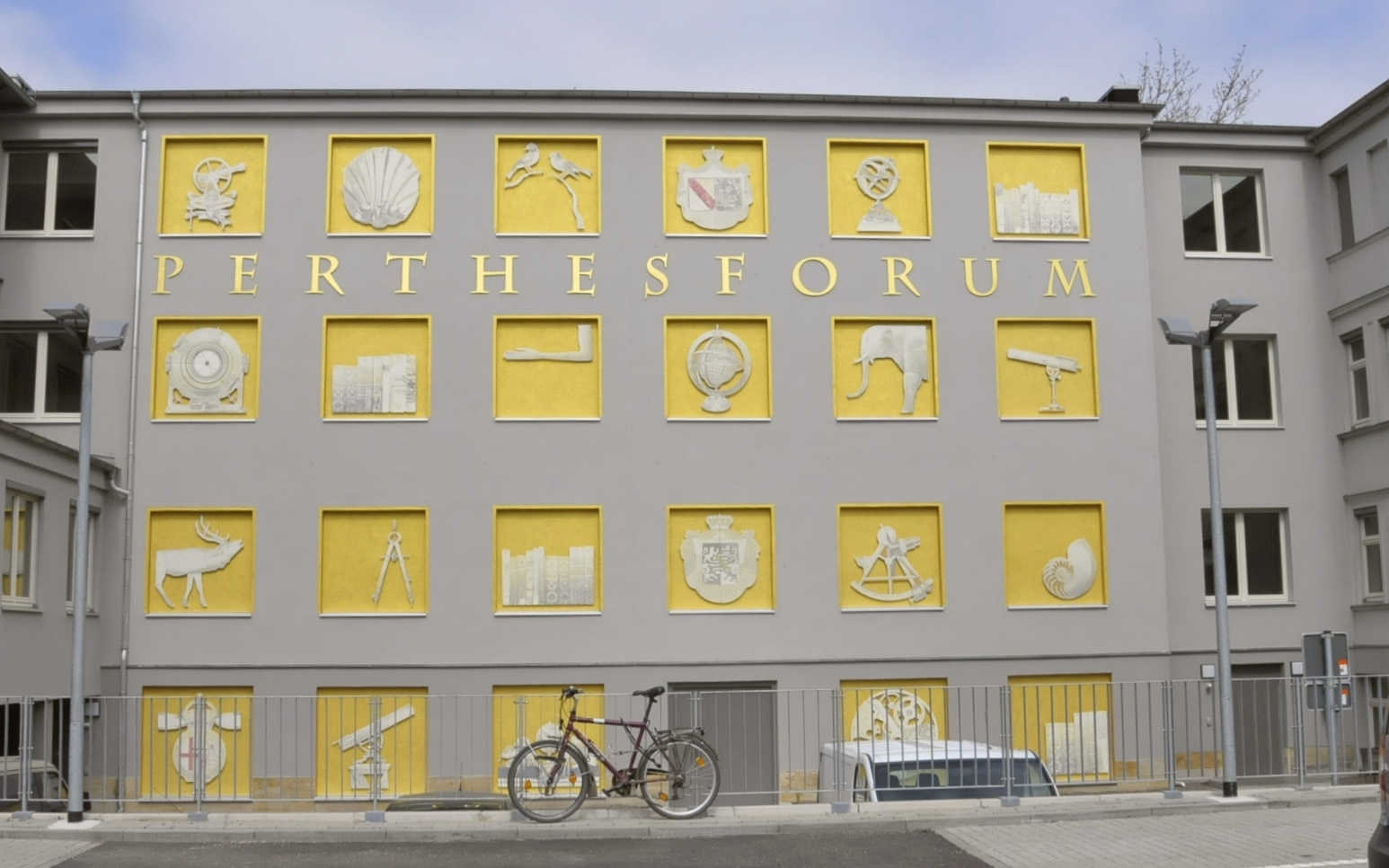
Gotha, Perthesforum

In 1992 Justus Perthes Verlag (Gotha and Darmstadt) was bought by Ernst Klett Schulbuchverlag, Stuttgart/Germany. In 2003 the Perthes archives (185,000 maps, 120,000 geographical publications and approximately 800 metres of business archives) were bought by the Free State of Thüringen and deposited in the Forschungsbibliothek Gotha, Part of the University of Erfurt. In 2010 the business premises and the accompanying land Justus-Perthes-Straße 3-9 and Gotthardstraße 6 (former „Perthes-Villa“, of 1890) were bought by the municipality of Gotha. The buildings were renovated and enlarged from 2012 through 2014 with public investment of 18,4 million Euro, and finally in 2015 reopened as Perthesforum. This was the end of the 230-year history of the publishing house; but the huge Perthes archives, which survived intact, remain available to scientists worldwide, scholars and interested parties: Now „Sammlung Perthes“, part of Forschungsbibliothek Gotha.

== Publishing history ==
=== Publishers ===
- Justus Perthes (September 11, 1749 – May 2, 1816)

He was founder of the firm that bears his name. He was born in the Thuringian town of Rudolstadt, the son of a Schwarzburg court physician. He worked as a bookseller in Gotha, where he founded the publishing firm 'Justus Perthes' in 1785. The main business was the publication of the noble almanacs

- Wilhelm Perthes (1793–1853)

Wilhelm joined his father's business in 1814. Before that time he had followed an apprenticeship in the publishing house of Justus's nephew Friedrich Christoph Perthes at Hamburg. He laid the foundation of the geographical branch of the business for which it is chiefly famous.

- Bernhardt Perthes (1824–1857)

From the moment that Bernhardt Perthes started to lead his firm it transformed from an ordinary publisher into an industrial business, as the production became too large to leave this to subcontractors. He bought new business premises and created departments for publishing, editing and drawing. The basis for all maps was still copper engraving, used till the Second World War. But for the printing Bernhardt Perthes switched to electrolytic reproduction and lithographic colourprint. His favourite printing process was ‘Chimitypie’, a process that transformed drawings or copper engravings into die-stamp engraving. It was his ambition that his firm not only would be the international center to distribute all new geographic information, but at the same time to become the international focus for gathering and disseminating of geographic information. To underline this ambition he changed the name of his firm into 'Justus Perthes Geographischer Anstalt', and also started to publish many wall map series and school atlases in foreign languages. To support this program he hired amongst others August Petermann, Ernst Behm, Hermann Berghaus and Carl Vogel. All of them prominent figures in their fields of interest. To prevent unwanted competition none of them was appointed to general manager. From his death onwards till Berhard Perthes took over in 1880 this role was reserved for Adolf Müller. During this period land was bought to provide accommodation for the departments for engraving, printing of copper plates and electrolytic reproduction.

- Bernhard Perthes (1858–1919)

After Bernhard Perthes had taken over, he added departments for lithography, letterpress and bookbinding. Only the colouring of the maps were still done by independent artisans. In 1881 the company employed 30 printers and 90 women or girls as colorists. In 1935 the number of employees had risen to 144: 57 editors and cartographers, 86 printers and 1 female colorist. Because the documentation for the almanacs and the number of geographic publications and maps had grown to such a volume, a new library was opened in 1911 measuring some 500 m^{2}. To honour their contributions to the company, busts of August Petermann and Hermann Wagner were placed in the reading room. Bernhard Perthes complained to Hermann Wagner that PGM had become a scientific and academic journal under the editorship of Supan, resulting in a decrease of subscriptions of 2,810 in 1884 to 1,330 in 1908.

- Dr. Joachim Perthes (1889-1954)
- Dr. Joachim Perthes and Wolf Jürgen Perthes (1921–1964) (1953-1964: Justus Perthes Geographische Verlagsanstalt Darmstadt)
- Stephan Justus Perthes (1955-...) (1980-1994: Justus Perthes Geographische Verlagsanstalt Darmstadt; 1992-1994: Hermann Haack / Justus Perthes Verlag Gotha GmbH)

From 1966 through 1980 the Darmstadt company was led by Gerhard Vaeth and Werner Painke (cartography, a pupil of Hermann Haack), until Stephan Justus Perthes was ready to take over the management.

(April 1992: Justus Perthes Gotha and Darmstadt sold to Ernst Klett Schulbuchverlag, Stuttgart. See www.perthes.de for more details (currently German only).

=== Publications ===
- Noble almanacs (1785–1944)
- Heusinger, Johann Heinrich Gottlieb. Handatlas über alle bekannte Laender des Erdbodens (1809)
- Stieler's Hand-Atlas über alle Theile der Erde und über das Weltgebäude (10 ed. 1817–1945)
- Stielers kleiner Schulatlas über alle Teile der Erde (93 ed. 1820–1914)
- F.M. Diez Post- und Reise-Karte von Deutschland und den anliegenden Laendern : bis London, Havre de Grace, Tours, Lyon, Genua, Bologna, Pesth, Warschau, Königsberg u. jenseits Kopenhagen, nebst den Haupt-Routen durch das übrige Europa = Carte Des Postes Et Routes De L'Allemagne Et De La Plus Grande Partie De L'Europe (geographisch entworfen von Ad[olf] St[ieler]) (1825)
- Adolf Stieler Karte von Deutschland, Dem Koenigr. Der Niederlande, Dem Kgr. Belgien, Der Schweiz und den angränzenden Ländern: bis Paris, Lyon, Turin, Mailand, Venedig, Ofen, Königsberg; in XXV Blättern (1829–1836)
- Heinrich Berghaus' Physikalischer Atlas : Oder Sammlung Von Karten, Auf Denen Die Hauptsächlichsten Erscheinungen Der Anorganischen Und Organischen Natur Nach Ihrer Geographischen Verbreitung Und Vertheilung Bildlich Dargestellt Sind (3 ed. 1837–1892)
- C. von Spruners Historisch-Geographischer Hand-Atlas von Europa (3 ed. 1837–1909)
- Atlas zur Geschichte von Bayern (1838–1852)
- E. von Sydows/Haack wall maps (1838–1857 and later)
- E. von Sydow's Methodischer Hand-Atlas für das wissenschaftliche Studium der Erdkunde Schulatlas (1844–1879)
- Justus Perthes' Taschenatlas (1845 and later)
- Eisen-Bahn-Atlas von Deutschland, Belgien, Elsass und dem nördlichtsen Theile von Italien (12 ed. 1847–1858)
- Petermanns Geographische Mitteilungen (1855–2004)
- Herman Berghaus' Chart of the world (16 ed. 1863–1924)
- Ferdinand von Hochstetter and August Petermann (eds.) Geologisch und Topographischer Atlas von Neu-Seeland (1863), English edition published in Auckland (1864)
- R. Grundemann's Allgemeiner Missions-Atlas (1867–1871)
- Theodor Menke Bibelatlas In Acht Blättern (1868)
- Bruno Hassenstein Atlas von Japan (1885–1887)
- Sydow-Wagners methodischer Schulatlas (23 ed. 1888–1944)
- Vogels Karte des Deutschen Reichs und der Alpenländer (1893–1915)
- R. Lüddecke's Deutscher Schulatlas (1897 and later)
- Paul Langhans Alldeutscher Atlas (1900 and later)
- Hermann Haack Geographen-Kalender (1903–1914)
- Alexander Supan Die territoriale Entwicklung der europäische Kolonien (1906)
- Hermann Haack Oberstufen-Atlas für hőheren Lehranstalten (1913)
- Richard Lepsius Geologische karte des deutschen Reiches (1913–1915)
- Hermann Haack Geographische Bausteine (1913–1996)
- Heinz Zeiss Seuchen-Atlas (1942–1945)
- Vom Bild zur Karte (1951–1966)
- Edgar Lehmann Weltatlas : die Staaten der Erde und ihre Wirtschaft (9 ed. 1952–1969)
- dtv-Perthes-Weltatlas (1973–1980)
- Welt-Atlas für Blinde (2006–2009)
- Justus Perthes' Taschenatlanten (Taschenatlas vom Deutschen Reich, See-Atlas, Atlas Antiquus, Geschichtsatlas, Staatsbürger-Atlas),
- Many publications concerning geographic schooling and concerning geography in general

== Literature ==
- Brogiato, Heinz Peter: Gotha als Wissens-Raum. In: Lentz, Sebastian & Ormeling, Ferjan (eds.): Die Verräumlichung des Welt-Bildes. Petermanns Geographische Mitteilungen zwischen „explorativer Geographie“ und der „Vermessenheit“ europäischer Raumphantasien, Stuttgart 2008, pp. 15–29.
- Demhardt, Imre Josef: Der Erde ein Gesicht geben. Petermanns geographische Mitteilungen und die Anfänge der modernen Geographie in Deutschland. Katalog zur Ausstellung der Universitäts- und Forschungsbibliothek Erfurt/Gotha im Spiegelsaal auf Schloß Friedenstein in Gotha, 23. Juni bis 9. Oktober 2005 (= Veröffentlichungen der Forschungsbibliothek Gotha 42). Gotha 2006, 127 p.
- Demhardt, Imre Josef: Justus Perthes (Germany). In: The history of cartography, volume 6. Chicago 2015, pp. 720–725.
- Espenhorst, Jürgen: Andree, Stieler, Meyer & Co. Handatlanten des deutschen Sprachraums (1800–1945) nebst Vorläufern und Abkömmlingen im In- und Ausland. Bibliographisches Handbuch, Schwerte 1994, ISBN 978-3-930401-33-8, pp. 44–137.
- Espenhorst, Jürgen: Petermann's Planet. A Guide to German Handatlases And Their Siblings Throughout the World 1800–1950, Bd. 1: The Great Handatlases, Schwerte 2003, ISBN 978-3-930401-35-2, pp. 179–346.
- Felsch, Philipp: Wie August Petermann den Nordpol erfand. München 2010, 270 p.
- Fick, Karl E.: Justus Perthes. Grundlagen, Wirkungsfelder und Funktionen eines geographisch-kartographischen Verlages. In: Geographisches Taschenbuch und Jahrweiser für Landeskunde, 1987/1988. Stuttgart 1987.
- Henniges, Norman & Philipp Julius Meyer: „Das Gesamtbild des Vaterlandes stets vor Augen“: Hermann Haack und die Gothaer Schulkartographie vom Wilhelminischen Kaiserreich bis zum Ende des Nationalsozialismus. In: Zeitschrift für Geographiedidaktik44, 4 (2016), pp. 37–60.
- Schelhaas, Bruno: Das „Wiederkehren des Fragezeichens in der Karte“. Gothaer Kartenproduktion im 19. Jahrhundert. In: Geographische Zeitschrift 97 (2009), 4, pp. 227–242.
- Smits, Jan: Petermann's Maps. Carto-bibliography of the maps in Petermanns Geographische Mitteilungen, 1855-1945. 't Goy-Houten 2004. ISBN 90-6194-249-7.
- Wardenga, Ute: Petermanns Geographische Mitteilungen, Geographische Zeitschrift und Geographischer Anzeiger. Eine vergleichende Analyse von Zeitschriften in der Geographie 1855–1945. In: Lentz, Sebastian & Ormeling, Ferjan (eds.): Die Verräumlichung des Welt-Bildes. Petermanns Geographische Mitteilungen zwischen „explorativer Geographie“ und der „Vermessenheit“ europäischer Raumphantasien, Stuttgart 2008, pp. 31–44.
- Weigel, Petra: Die Sammlung Perthes Gotha (= Patrimonia, 254). Berlin, Kulturstiftung der Länder 2011, 102 p.
- Das Heilige Land in Gotha : der Verlag Justus Perthes und die Palästinakartographie im 19. Jahrhundert, Gotha : Forschungsbibliothek Gotha, 2014.
