= Justus Perthes =

German publisher (1749–1816)

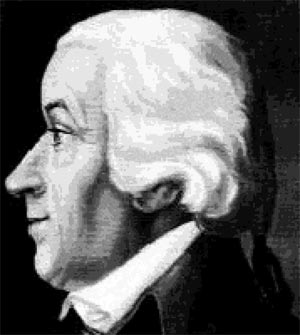
- Justus Perthes
- Born: Johann Georg Justus Perthes; 11 September 1749; Rudolstadt, Schwarzburg-Rudolstadt, Holy Roman Empire
- Died: 2 May 1816 (aged 66); Gotha, Saxe-Gotha-Altenburg, Holy Roman Empire
- Occupation: Publisher
- Known for: Founding the publishing house Justus Perthes Geographische Anstalt Gotha
- Children: Wilhelm Perthes
- Relatives: Friedrich Christoph Perthes (nephew)

Johann Georg Justus Perthes (11 September 1749 – 2 May 1816) was a German publisher and founder of the publishing house that bears his name.

== Life ==
He was born in the Thuringian town of Rudolstadt, the son of a Schwarzburg court physician. From 1778 he worked as a bookseller in nearby Gotha, where he founded the cartographic publishing firm Justus Perthes Geographische Anstalt Gotha in 1785. In this, he was joined in 1814 by his son Wilhelm Perthes (1793–1853), who had been in the publishing house of Justus's nephew Friedrich Christoph Perthes at Hamburg. On Justus' death in Gotha, Wilhelm took over the firm and laid the foundation of the geographical branch of the business for which it is chiefly famous, by the first publishing of the Hand-Atlas from 1817–1823 after Adolf Stieler (1775–1836).

Wilhelm Perthes engaged the collaboration of the most eminent German geographers of the time, including Stieler, Heinrich Berghaus (1797–1884), Christian Gottlieb Reichard (1758–1837), who was associated with Stieler in the compilation of the atlas, Karl Spruner (1803–1892), and Emil von Sydow (1812–1873).

The business passed to his grandson Bernhardt Wilhelm Perthes (1821–1857), who was associated with August Heinrich Petermann under whose direction the well-known periodical Petermanns Geographische Mitteilungen was first edited in 1855, and Bruno Hassenstein (1839–1902); and in the next generation to his son Bernhard Perthes (1858–1919), who was born after his father Bernhardt Wilhelm had died.

Since 1785 the firm also issued the Almanach de Gotha, a statistical, historical and genealogical annual (in German and French) of the various countries of the world (first published by Carl Wilhelm Ettinger, Gotha, in 1763); and in 1866 the elaborate Geographisches Jahrbuch was produced under the editorship of Ernst Behm (1830–1884), on whose death it was continued under that of Professor Hermann Wagner.
