= Hermann Haack =

German geographer and cartographer

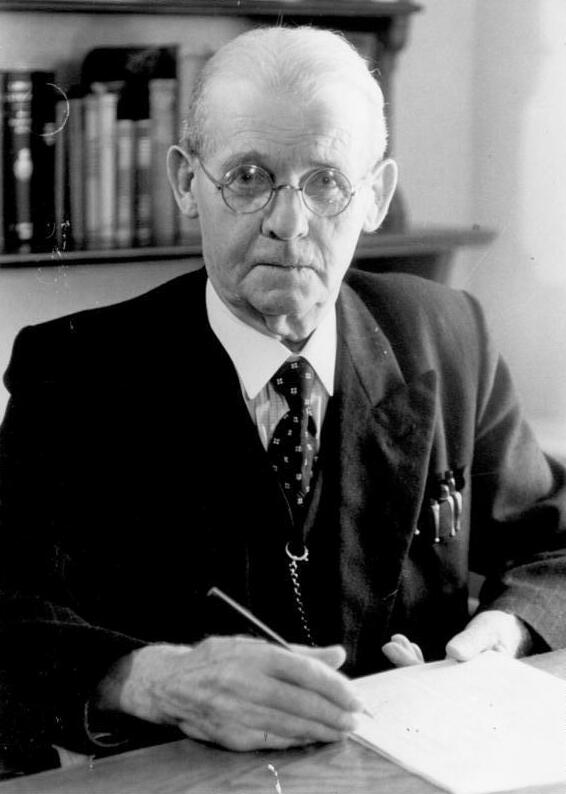
Prof. Hermann Haack (1957)

Hermann Otto Haack (Friedrichswerth, 29 October 1872 - Gotha 22 February 1966) was a German geographer and cartographer.

His father ran a post office in Friedrichswerth. Haack attended the local elementary school from 1878 to 1883. By chance he met Bernhard Perthes, who supported him financially and enabled him to study in Halle, where he started in 1893 to study geography and cartography. Later he moved to the Georg-August-Universität Göttingen, where he became a student of the geographer Hermann Wagner (1840–1929). On his recommendation, Haack was subsequently transferred to Friedrich Wilhelm University Berlin where he became an assistant to Ferdinand von Richthofen. In 1896 Haack successfully completed his studies with his Thesis Über die mittlere Höhe von Süd Amerika (About the middle elevation of South America).

After completing his military service in 1897, Haack took up a permanent position with Justus Perthes Publishers in Gotha, where he had worked from time to time as a student. The first major project in which Haack was involved was with his former teacher Richard Lüddecke's Deutsche Schulatlas. After his early death in 1888, his task was taken over by Hermann Habenicht.

Helbigs Reisewege in Nordost-Honduras. – Vereinfacht dargestellt nach der Karte Entwurf einer topographischen Übersicht von Nordost-Honduras mit der Mosquitia. In: Petermanns Geographische Mitteilungen, 101. Jahrgang, Gotha, VEB Hermann Haack, 1957, Heft 2, Tafel 15.

From 1898, Haack was responsible for the development of Perthes' school wall maps. Three editions were made of each map (geographical, historical, physical). Very strong colours ensured that the essential map content was easily recognizable in the classrooms, even from a distance. He further developed the existing colour symbolism for physical maps: green = soil; red = cities; blue = body of water; brown = mountains. This 'physical colouring', developed by the cartographer Emil von Sydow in the 19th century, has hardly lost any importance for school lessons to this day. Haack also played an important role in a complete revision of Stielers Handatlas. The tenth edition was published from 1920 to 1944 in several editions containing over 250 maps, which were still engraved in copper.

In 1903 Haack founded the magazine Geographischer Anzeiger. When he founded the 'Verband Deutscher Schulgeographen' (Association of German School Geographers) in 1912, it functioned as the association's magazine. In 1944 Haack withdrew into private life. After the end of World War II, the Soviet occupation forces returned Haack to the Geographical Institute, where he worked almost to the end of his life. After the expropriation without compensation by the city council of Gotha in January 1953, the now public Justus Perthes Publishers was renamed "VEB Hermann Haack Geographic Cartographic Institute Gotha" in October 1955. Until 1989, 'Haack Gotha' was the GDR's monopoly publishing house for cartographic school publications (mainly atlases and wall maps). From 1948 to 1954, Haack was editor-in-chief of Petermanns Geographische Mitteilungen. He was considered a confidant of the occupying power and later in the GDR, as he had been a 'correspondence member of the Geographical Society of the USSR' since 1932.

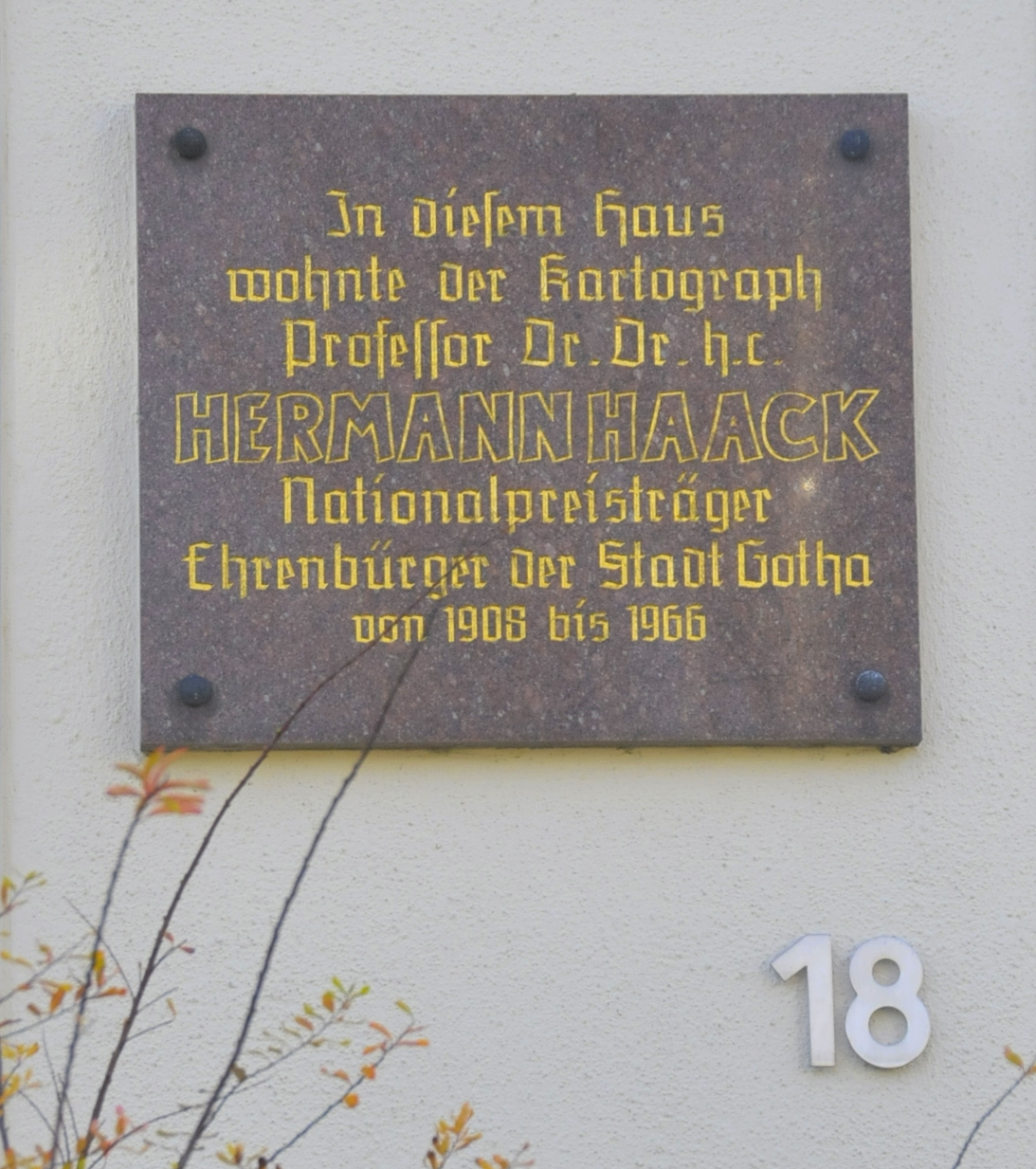
Gotha, Emminghausstraße 18

== Literature ==
- Günter Bauerfeind: Hermann Haack 1872–1966 – Nestor der deutschen Kartographie. Schriftenreihe des Urania Kultur- und Bildungsvereins Gotha e.V. Urania, Gotha 2009.
- Heinz Peter Brogiato: „Wissen ist Macht – Geographisches Wissen ist Weltmacht“. Die schulgeographischen Zeitschriften im deutschsprachigen Raum (1880–1945) unter besonderer Berücksichtigung des Geographischen Anzeigers (= Materialien zur Didaktik der Geographie, Vol. 18, Issue 1). Geographische Gesellschaft Trier, Trier 1998, pp. 153–167.
- Norman Henniges, Philipp Julius Meyer: „Das Gesamtbild des Vaterlandes stets vor Augen“: Hermann Haack und die Gothaer Schulkartographie vom Wilhelminischen Kaiserreich bis zum Ende des Nationalsozialismus. In: Zeitschrift für Geographiedidaktik, Vol. 44, Issue 4 (2016), pp. 37–60. (online)
- Helmut Langer: Hermann Haack. Schöpfer der Wand-Atlanten. In: Urania Kultur und Bildungsverein Gotha e.V. (Hrsg.): Gothaer Geowissenschaftler in 220 Jahren. msb kommunikation, Gotha 2005, pp. 36–38.
- Philipp Julius Meyer: Kartographie und Weltanschauung. Visuelle Wissensproduktion im Verlag Justus Perthes 1890–1945. Wallstein, Göttingen 2021.
- Philipp Julius Meyer: Hermann Haack zum 150. Geburtstag (1872–1966). Eine kritische Betrachtung. In: Kartographische Nachrichten, Vol. 3 (2022), No. 72, pp. A4–A10.
