= Werner Horn =

Werner Horn may refer to:

- Werner Horn, perpetrator of the 1915 Vanceboro international bridge bombing
- Werner Horn (South African politician) (born 1970), South African member of parliament
- Werner D. Horn, American politician
- Werner Horn (cartographer), German geographer and cartographer
