= Hermann Guthe =

Hermann Guthe may refer to:

- Hermann Guthe (theologian) (1849–1936), German Semitic scholar
- Hermann Guthe (geographer) (1824–1874), German geographer
