= Werner Horn (cartographer) =

German geographer and cartographer (1903–1978)

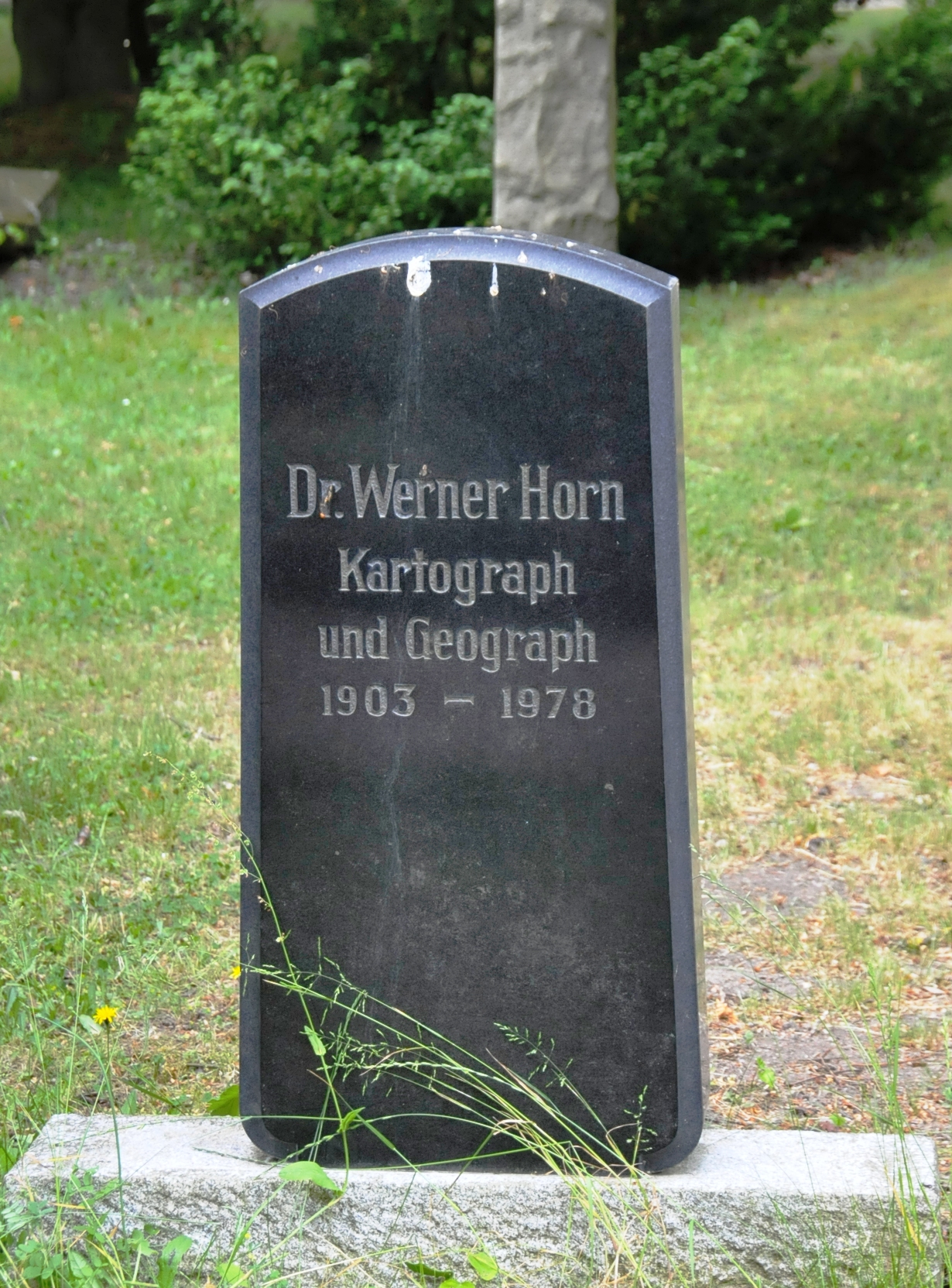
Gravestone of Werner Horn

Werner Friedrich Hermann Horn (19 April 1903 - 8 December 1978) was a German geographer and cartographer.

In 1940, he became an employee of Justus Perthes in Gotha. After the end of World War II, he became an employee of the cartographer Hermann Haack, who was brought back to the old company by the then Soviet occupation forces. Here, at the "VEB Hermann Haack Geographic Cartographic Institute Gotha", he worked until his death in 1978, when he was 75 years old. He was editor-in-chief of Petermanns Geographische Mitteilungen from 1954 to 1968.

Horn bequeathed part of his estate to the Gotha Museums. In 2008, the library became the property of the Free State of Thuringia, represented by the Gotha State Archives, now the Stiftung Schloss Friedenstein Museum for Regional History and Folklore, which had been in charge until then, had reoriented itself in relation to its service library and for capacity reasons.

Horn was buried in the Hauptfriedhof Gotha.
