= Nikolaus Creutzburg =

German geographer

- Born: April 10, 1893; Fünfhöfen, Kreis Strelno
- Died: 1 October 1978 (aged 85); Freiburg im Breisgau
- Education: Ludwig-Maximilians-Universität München; University of Vienna
- Known for: Research on Crete, Cartography, Regional Geography
- Scientific career
- Fields: Geography
- Workplaces: University of Münster; Gdańsk University of Technology; University of Göttingen; University of Freiburg

Nikolaus Creutzburg (Fünfhöfen, Kreis Strelno, 10 April 1893 – Freiburg im Breisgau 1 October 1978) was a German geographer.

== Early life ==
Creutzburg was born in Posen as the son of a landowner and grew up in Thuringia from 1902 onwards. There he attended the humanistic gymnasium in Jena, where he graduated in 1912. From 1912 until the outbreak of the World War I Creutzburg studied geography at the Ludwig-Maximilians-Universität München, mainly under Erich Dagobert von Drygalski; he was enrolled at the University of Vienna for one semester. Other teachers in Munich were the Alpine geologist August Rothpletz and the paleontologist Ferdinand Broili. In 1920 Creutzburg received his doctorate with the thesis Die Formen der Eiszeit im Ankogelgebiet. From 1922 he was an assistant to Ludwig Mecking (1879–1952) at the University of Münster, where he habilitated in 1924 with a ground-breaking thesis on Standortfragen der Industrie des Thüringer Waldes. In this work, he explored new possibilities for the cartographic representation of the facts and development of industrial location issues.

== Career ==
At first Creutzburg turned to two main areas of work, which became his main research areas: cartography and the geomorphological exploration of the island Crete. His interest in this island was stimulated by Alfred Philippson, the pioneer of geological and geographical research in the eastern Mediterranean. In 1925 and 1926 Creutzburg undertook research trips to Crete, which were followed by two publications on The Landschaften der Insel Kreta (1927) und Kreta, Leben und Landschaft (1928).

After Creutzburg became professor by special appointment at the Gdańsk University of Technology in 1928, his research focus shifted, in that he devoted himself primarily to tasks and obligations of a regional and folklore nature. His publications of this time mainly concern the city of Danzig, Poland and the German folklore in the East. During his time in Danzig, Creutzburg also worked as a Gau clerk for geography in the National Socialist Teachers' Association (NSLB). In November 1933 he signed the Bekenntnis der Professoren an den deutschen Universitäten und Hochschulen zu Adolf Hitler. In 1934, Creutzburg was appointed to a commission that primarily dealt with research of Eastern countries. Together with Carl Troll and Erich Obst, he became a member of the "German Political and Economic Studies" committee at the German Academy in Munich and in 1936 a member of the German National Academy of Sciences Leopoldina in Halle.

From 1938 till the end of World War II Creutzburg was editor-in-chief of Petermann’s Geographische Mitteilungen.

From 1939 to 1945 Creutzburg was drafted into the Wehrmacht. Most recently working in army surveying, he was taken prisoner of war after the end of the war. Since he had been a NSDAP candidate and Wehrmacht officer before 1945, he was refused a return to the chair in Dresden, and he switched to the University of Göttingen, where he taught geography from 1946 at the Institute of Hans Mortensen (1894–1964).

In 1948, Creutzburg received a professorship at the University of Freiburg, first as deputy chair and from 1951 as full professor and director of the Geographical Institute, where he retired in 1961.

In addition to his research on climatological topics, Creutzburg turned back to the island of Crete from 1956 onwards, where he stayed twice a year. A geological map of Crete on a scale of 1:200,000 was published in 1977 on the basis of the terrain surveys by Creutzburg and his colleagues. In 1958 a study on the problems of mountain structure and morphogenesis on the island of Crete was published. In addition, Creutzburg dealt with paleontological and settlement and economic geographical problems of this Mediterranean island.

== Bibliography ==
- Die Formen der Eiszeit im Ankogelgebiet Berlin. Borntraeger, 1921 (thesis)
- Das Lokalisationsphänomen der Industrien: am Beispiel des nordwestlichen Thüringer Waldes. Engelhorn, Stuttgart 1925 (Habilitation paper)
- Die Entwicklung des nordwestlichen Thüringer Waldes zur Kulturlandschaft. In: Freie Wege vergleichender Erdkunde, München 1925
- Kreta: Leben und Landschaft; nach einem Vortrag ... In: Zeitschrift der Gesellschaft für Erdkunde zu Berlin, ISSN 1614-2055 (1928), p. 16–38
- Kultur im Spiegel der Landschaft: das Bild der Erde in seiner Gestaltung durch den Menschen, ein Bilderatlas. Leipzig, Bibliogr. Inst., 1930
- Ostpreussen: anlässlich des 24. Deutschen Geographentag in Danzig, den Teilnehmern am Geographentag 1931. Gotha, Perthes, 1931
- Landschaften des deutschen Nordostens Breslau, 1931
- Der Nordosten; 1. Landschaften des deutschen Nordostens. Hirt, 1931
- Danzig und sein Hinterland In: Verhandl. u. Wissensch. Abhandl. d. 24. Deutsch. Geogr.-Tages. Danzig, 1931
- Rechtsverhältnisse im Danziger Hafen. In: Petermanns Geographische Mitteilungen, Band 78, 1932
- Meyers grosser Hand-Atlas, 360 Haupt- und Nebenkarten nebst alphabetischem Namenverzeichnis, geographischen Kartenerläuterungen und einem Leseglas. Leipzig, Bibliograph. Inst., 1933
- Die ländlichen Siedlungen der Insel Kreta In: Die ländlichen Siedlungen in verschiedenen Klimazonen (1933), p, 55–66
- Die Volkstumsfrage im deutschen Ostraum. 1933
- Sprache und Volkstum im deutschen Ostraum. In: Petermanns Geographische Mitteilungen. Jrg. 80, 1934
- Die Bedeutung des deutschen Ostens für das Schicksal unseres Volkes In: Zeitschrift für Erdkunde 4/1936, p. 1–12
- Atlas der Freien Stadt Danzig. Danzig: Danziger Verl.-Ges., 1936
- Die Landschaften Thüringens. In: Zeitschrift für Erdkunde, 4/1936
- Das Schicksal der deutschen Volksgruppe im Industriebezirk von Bialystok. In: Deutsche Monatshefte in Polen, Jrg. 3(13), Heft 5, 1936
- Die Weichsel in ostmitteleuropäischen Raum. In: Die Weichsel. Ihre Bedeutung als Strom und Schiffahrtsstraße und ihre Kulturaufgaben, Leipzig (1939), p. 1–76
- Friedrich Leyden: ein deutscher Geograph In: Zeitschrift der Gesellschaft für Erdkunde zu Berlin, ISSN 0013-9998 (1950/51), 3/4, p. 339–347
- Klima, Klimatypen und Klimakarten, in: Petermanns geographische Mitteilungen, 94/1950
- Otto Jessen: 18. Februar 1891 – 9. Juni 1951 In: Jahrbuch, ISSN 0084-6090 (1952), p. 189–196
- Freiburg und der Breisgau: ein Führer durch Landschaft und Kultur. Freiburg i.Br., Schulz, 1954
- Freiburg und der Breisgau: ein Führer durch Landschaft und Kultur. Freiburg i. Br., Kehrer, 1954
- Eine Methode zur kartographischen Darstellung der Jahreszeitenklimate In: Tagungsbericht und wissenschaftliche Abhandlungen, ISSN 0083-5684 (1957), p. 266–271
- Probleme des Gebirgsbaues und der Morphogenese auf der Insel Kreta. Freiburg im Breisgau, Schulz, 1958
- Klimatypen der Erde. Mit Karl Albert Habbe Karte 1:50 Mio. 1964
- Die Ethia-Serie des südlichen Mittelkreta und ihre Ophiolithvorkommen. Berlin [u.a.], Springer, 1969

== Literature ==
- Altpreußische Biographie. Band 4,2, p. 1194
- Wolfgang Weischet: Zum Tode von Nikolaus Creutzburg. In: Geographische Zeitschrift 67, 1979, p. 105–109.
- Wolfgang Weischet: Nikolaus Creutzburg zum Gedenken. In: Freiburger Universitätsblätter Jg. 17, H. 62, Dez. 1978, p. 6–8.
- Franz Kirchheimer: Nikolaus Creutzburg. In: Jahrbuch der Heidelberger Akademie der Wissenschaften für das Jahr 1979, Heidelberg 1980, p. 69–70.
- Rudolf Ullmann: Creutzburg, Nikolaus, Geograph. In: Badische Biographien. Neue Folge Bd. 3, Stuttgart 1990, p. 57–58.
- Mechtild Rössler: Wissenschaft und Lebensraum. Geographische Ostforschung im Nationalsozialismus. Berlin/Hamburg 1990. Bild: Archiv der Heidelberger Akademie der Wissenschaften.
