= Hermann Wagner (geographer) =

German geographer and cartographer

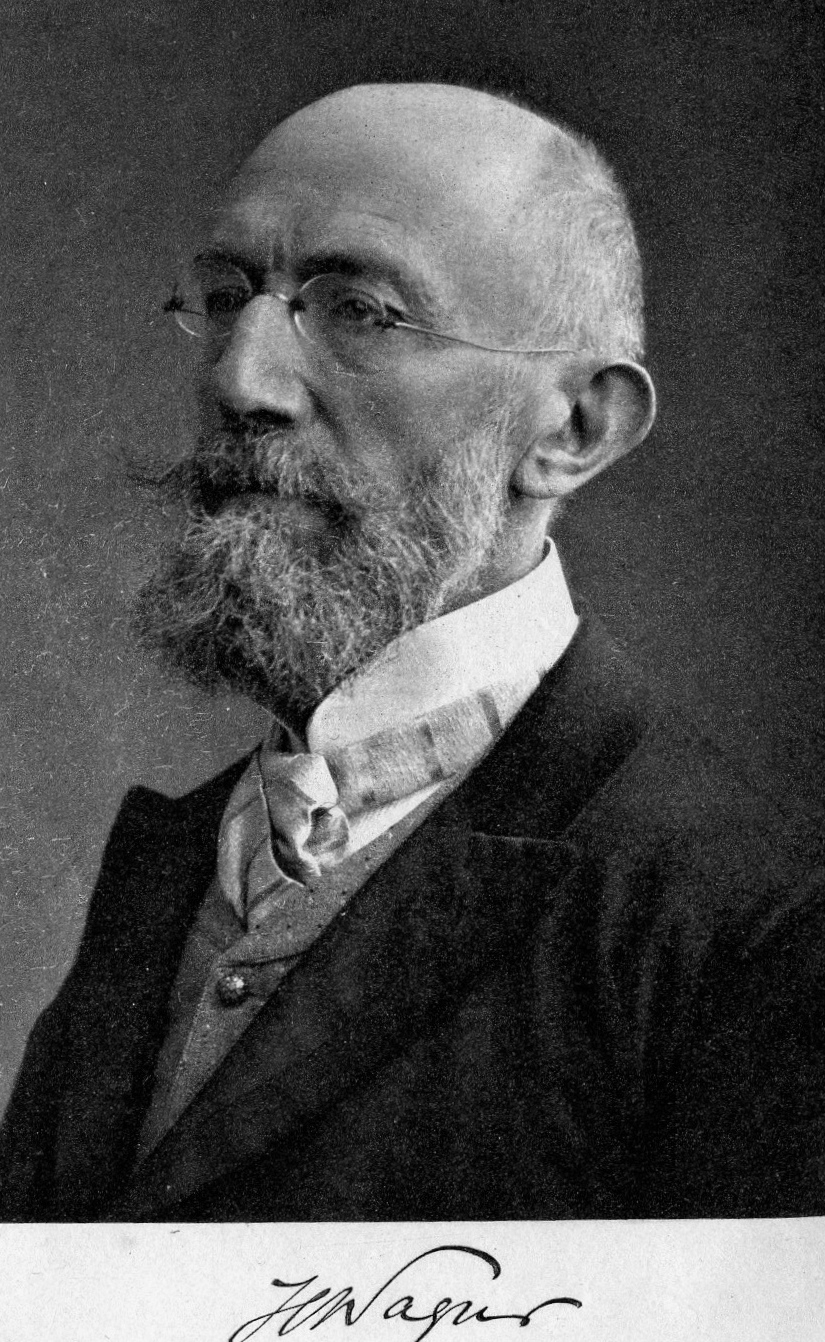
Hermann Wagner

Hermann Wagner (23 June 1840 – 18 June 1929) was a German geographer and cartographer who was a native of Erlangen. He was the son of anatomist Rudolf Wagner (1805–1864) and brother to economist Adolph Wagner (1835–1917).

Wagner received his education at the Universities of Göttingen and Erlangen. He wrote a doctoral thesis on the determination of the surface of brains, among his objects of research the brain of the mathematician Carl Friedrich Gauss. From 1864 to 1876, he taught classes in mathematics and natural history at the Ernestine Gymnasium, Gotha. When the Freies Deutsches Hochstift (Free German Foundation) was founded in 1859, Wagner was one of its 56 founding members.

In 1868, Wagner began work for the publishing firm Justus Perthes as an editor in the statistical section of the Gothaer Almanack. Beginning in 1872, with Ernst Behm, he was editor of the geographical/statistical review Die Bevolkerung der Erde.

In 1876, he got the first chair of geography at the University of Königsberg, and kept the same position from 1880 until 1920 at the University of Göttingen as successor to Johann Eduard Wappäus. From 1879 to 1920, he was editor of the Geographisches Jahrbuch

In 1883–84, he published a new edition of Hermann Guthe's Lehrbuch der Geographie. He is also associated with the Sydow-Wagner Methodischer Schulatlas, a school atlas that is named in conjunction with cartographer Emil von Sydow.

Wagner was member of the German Academy of Sciences Leopoldina since 1878; in 1908 he was awarded the Carl-Ritter-Medal and in 1910 the Cullum Geographical Medal.
