= Paul Langhans =

German geographer and cartographer

Paul Max Harry Langhans (Hamburg, 1 April 1867 – Gotha 17 January 1952) was a German geographer and cartographer.

Paul Langhans, son of the innkeeper Paul Langhans (1838–1922), attended the Hamburg Realgymnasium from 1878 to 1886. From 1886 to 1889 he studied geography, natural science and economics at the Christian Albrechts University in Kiel and at the Leipzig University. In 1889 he became an employee of Justus Perthes (publishing company) in Gotha. In the decades that followed, Langhans published numerous maps and atlases, including the Deutschen Kolonialatlas (German Colonial Atlas, 1897). In 1902 he founded the magazine Deutsche Erde, which agitated for the 'Alldeutscher Verband' (1891–1939) and statements of the 'Volks- und Kulturbodenforschung' which supported ethnocentristic and geopolitical issues and aspects of national politics in German Reich, especially in the interwar period. Langhans is considered one of the most important German representatives of this policy.

In his capacity as a member of the antisemitic 'Deutschsoziale Reformpartei' (German Social Reform Party), Langhans edited the Antisemitischen Monatsblatts from 1896 to 1907. From 1909 to 1942, he was Federal Director of the Deutschbund, whose members regarded themselves as the 'racial elite', which strove for a deepening of being German. In 1931 Langhans joined the NSDAP, for which he worked as a training speaker at the NSDAP district school in Schönau vor dem Walde. He became a Gotha councilor (from 1936) and cultural advisor to the city council (since 1938). Partly because of these merits, he was granted honorary citizenship of the city of Gotha on April 1, 1940. In its honorary citizenship letter, the city especially praised him "for his always self-sacrificing commitment to building the NSDAP, for his decades-long work as an advocate for national awakening", and only afterwards "for his outstanding work of world renown as a geographic scientist of the German kind".

From 1909 to 1937 he was editor-in-chief of Petermann's Geographischen Mitteilungen and since 1923 editor-in-chief of the Gothaischer Hofkalenders.

The 'Langhans Volcano' in the Pacific Ocean and the 'Langhans Glacier' on Spitsbergen are named after him.

Langhans was married with Rosa Rasch, (1870–1960), with whom he had a daughter, Irmtrud (1907–1998).

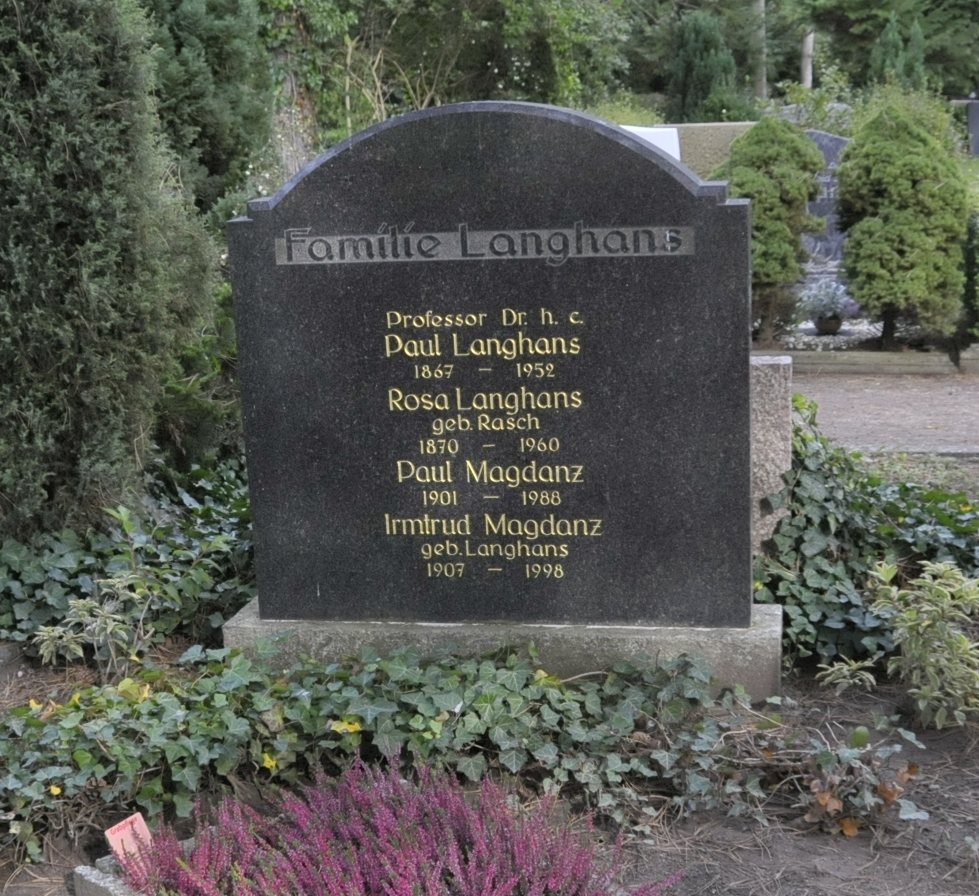
Gravestone of family Langhans in Gotha

== Works ==
- Deutscher Kolonial-Atlas, Gotha 1893–1897. (15 Lieferungen)
- Kleiner Handels-Atlas für Lehranstalten, Gotha 1895.
- Justus Perthes’ Staatsbürger-Atlas, Gotha 1896, 4. Aufl. 1904.
- Deutscher Marine-Atlas, Gotha 1898.
- Deutscher Armee-Atlas, Gotha 1899.
- Handelsschul-Atlas, Gotha 1901.
- Links und rechts der Eisenbahn, Gotha 1901–1909. (74 Hefte)
- Deutsche Erde, Gotha 1902.
- Die Förderung der Landkultur in Schleswig-Holstein von 1914–1929, Kiel 1929.
- Wandkarten zur Wirtschafts- und Kolonialbewegung, Gotha o. J.

== Literature ==
- Gerhard Engelmann (1982). Langhans, Paul. In: Deutsche Biographie.
- Philipp Julius Meyer (2021). Kartographie und Weltanschauung. Visuelle Wissensproduktion im Verlag Justus Perthes 1890–1945. Wallstein, Göttingen.
