= Stielers Handatlas =

German atlas

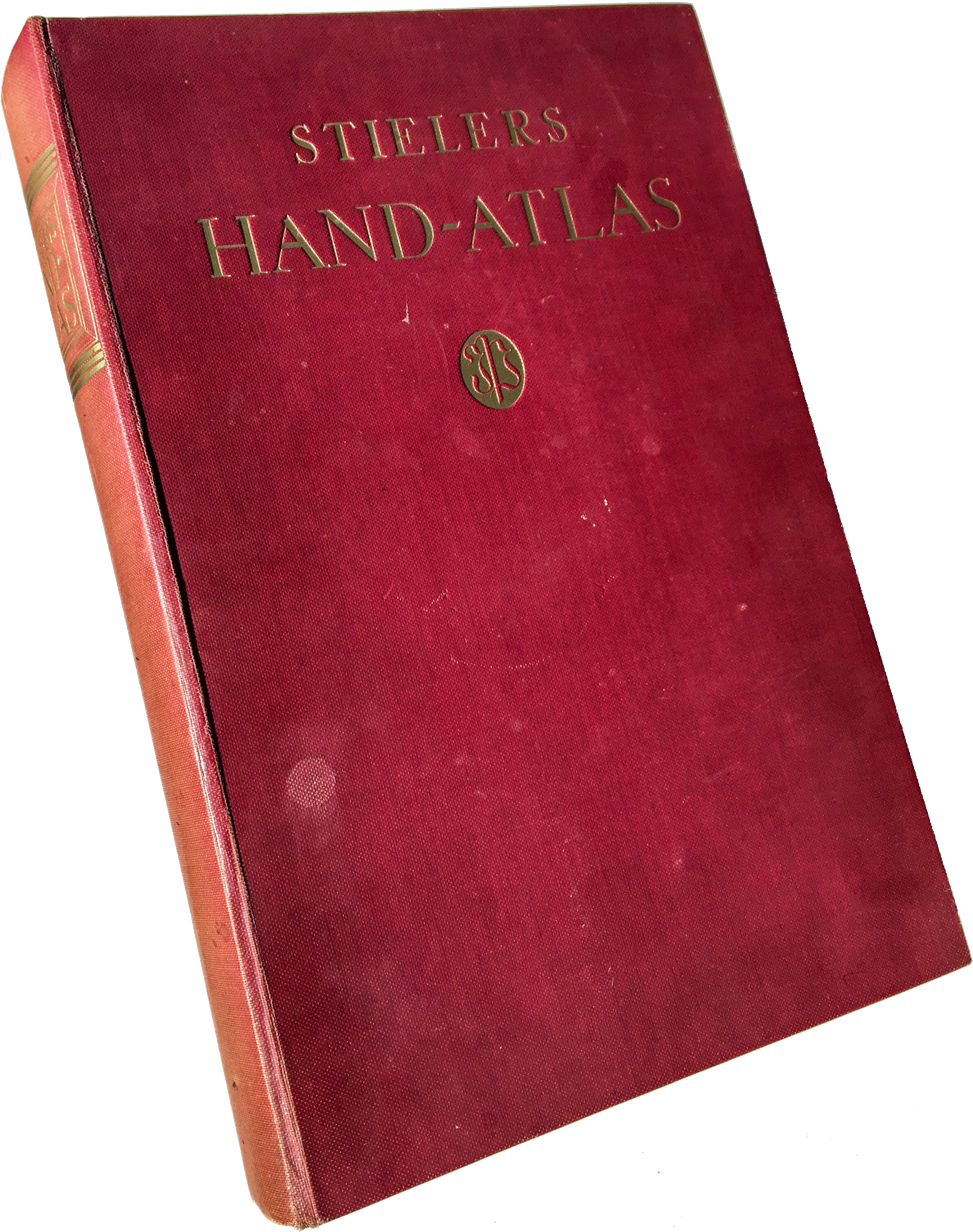
Stielers Handatlas 10th Edition

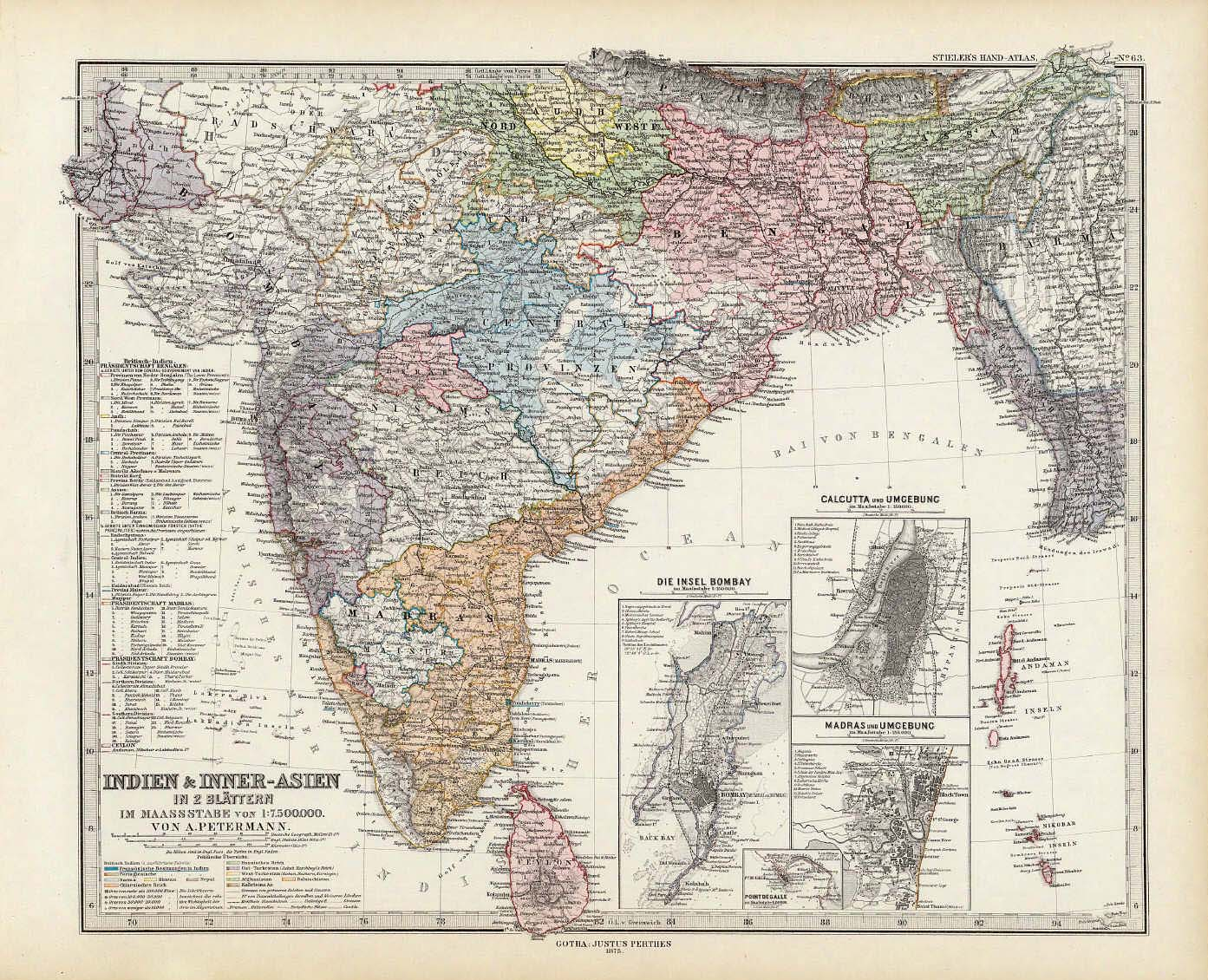
Map of India and Asia, printed in Stieler's Atlas

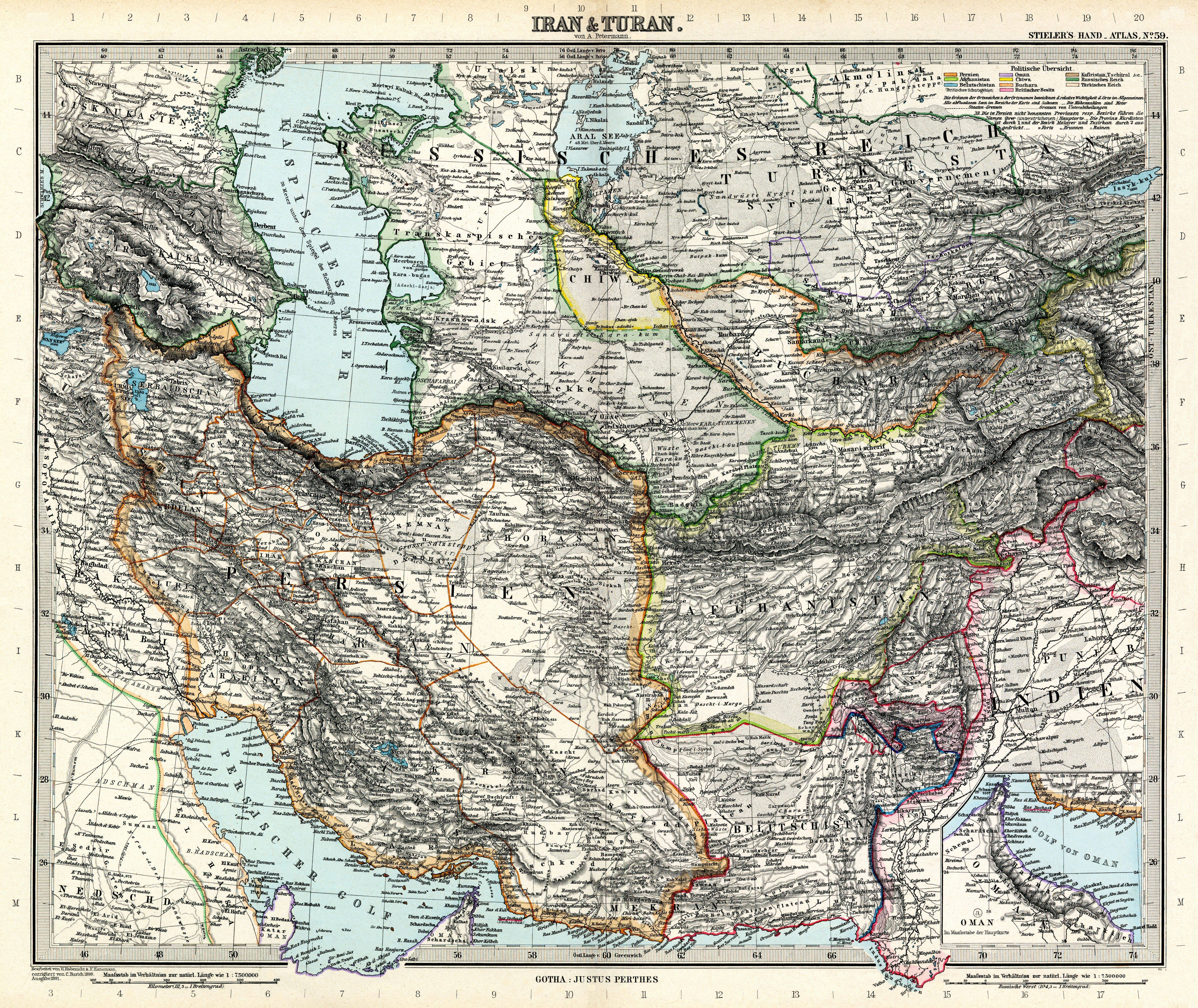
Map of Iran and Turan in Qajar dynasty drawn by Adolf Stieler

Stielers Handatlas (after Adolf Stieler, 1775–1836), formally titled Hand-Atlas über alle Theile der Erde und über das Weltgebäude (Handy atlas of all parts of the world and of the universe), was the leading German world atlas of the last three decades of the 19th and the first half of the 20th century. Published by Justus Perthes of Gotha (established 1785 and still existing there) it went through ten editions from 1816 to 1945. As with many 19th century publications, an edition was issued in parts; for example, the eighth edition was issued in 32 monthly parts.

== Editions ==
The earliest edition, by Stieler and Christian Gottlieb Reichard, was published as separate plates from 1817 to 1823. There were 47 maps, though the intention had been to publish 50. After Stieler's death Friedrich von Stülpnagel (1786–1865) edited the first (1834-1845) edition, and the second (1845–47) with 107 maps. Petermann contributed to the third (1854–62) edition containing 83 maps, the fourth (1864–67) and the fifth (1868–74), each with 84 maps.

However, it was not until the sixth edition (1871–75, 90 maps), edited by August Petermann (1822–78), Hermann Berghaus (1828–1890) and Carl Vogel (1828–1897), that the work reached the high scientific level and the unsurpassed relief Stieler's Atlas is famous for. A seventh edition was issued 1879-82; an eighth 1888-91 (both 95 maps) under the direction of Hermann Berghaus, Vogel and Hermann Habenicht (1844–1917). Although the printing industry had already changed to lithography for some time, some maps in Stieler's Atlas were still reproduced by copper-plate printing on hand presses with hand colouring into the 1890s.

The ninth edition (1901–05), edited by Habenicht, with one hundred maps, over double the number of the initial edition, was the first one printed on cylinder machines by means of lithography, which halved the price and made the Stieler accessible to a broad public. 16 maps hereof were exclusively translated to English, transferred to Imperial units and became part the 11th edition of the Encyclopædia Britannica (1910–1911). Hermann Haack (1872–1966) edited the tenth (centenary) edition (1920–25, 108 maps), with an index to 320,000 entries being the most comprehensive world atlas of modern times.

English versions of the ninth and tenth editions appeared as Stieler's Atlas of Modern Geography, and editions with similar titles were also issued in French, Italian and Spanish. An international edition (1934–1940) remained with 84 of the 114 maps planned incomplete due to wartime circumstances. The work was engraved on 432 copper plates which have been preserved.

== Sources ==
- Justus Perthes (publishing company)
