= Hachure map =

Mode of representing relief on a map

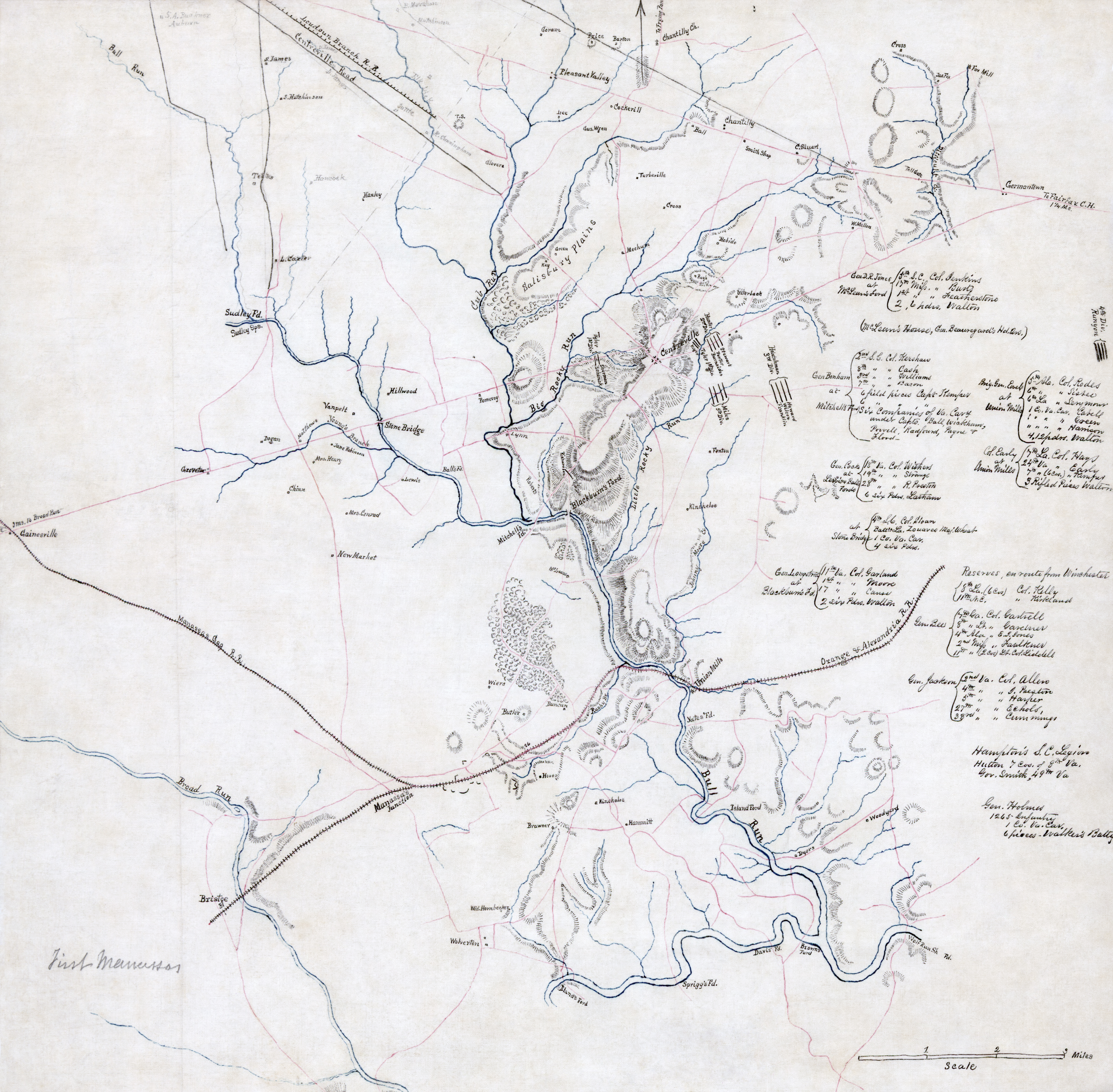
A Confederate position map of the First Battle of Manassas from the American Civil War. Includes some troop positions and lists of Confederate regiments with the names of their commanders. Relief shown by hachures. Scale [1:63,360].

Hachures (/ˈhæʃʊərz/) are an older mode of representing relief. They show orientation of slope, and by their thickness and overall density they provide a general sense of steepness. Being non-numeric, they are less useful to a scientific survey than contours, but can successfully communicate quite specific shapes of terrain. They are a form of shading, although different from the one used in shaded maps.

Hachure representation of relief was standardized by the German topographer Johann Georg Lehmann in 1799. Hachures may be combined with other ways of representing relief, such as shades, the result being a shaded hachure map; an example of such a map is the Dufour Map of Switzerland. Emil von Sydow designed maps with coloured hachures: green for lowlands and brown for highlands.

== Overview ==
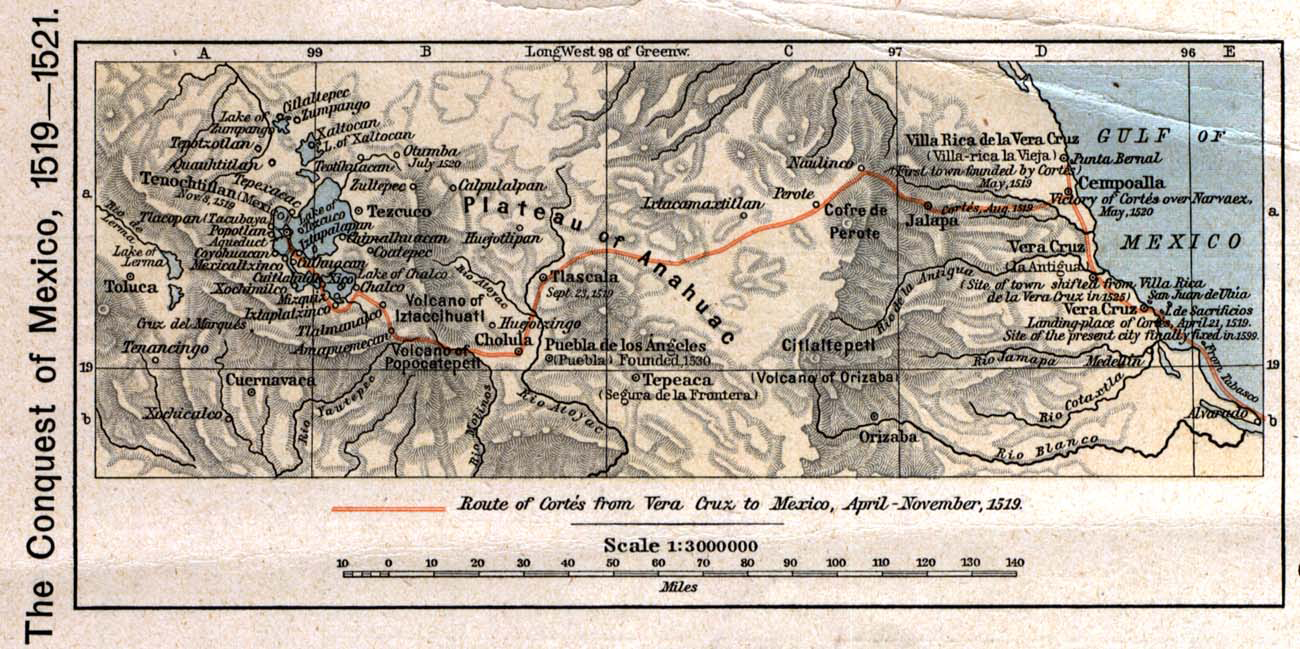
A hachure map depicting Cortes' invasion route of Mexico.

Hachures are strokes (short line segments or curves) drawn in the direction of the steepest slope (the aspect direction). Steeper slopes are represented by thicker, shorter strokes, while gentler slopes are represented by thinner, longer and farther apart strokes. A very gentle slope or a flat area, like the top of a hill, is usually left blank.

The hachures are traditionally monocolour, usually black, gray or brown. Using two complementary colours for the hachures on a neutral background colour (e.g. black and white lines on gray map colour) would give a shading effect as if the relief were illuminated.

== Rules ==
In representing relief with hachures on a map, six rules are to be followed, according to G.R.P. Lawrence (1979):

1. The hachures are drawn in the direction of the steepest gradient.
2. The hachures are arranged in rows perpendicular to their direction.
3. The length and thickness of each stroke represents the drop in height along its direction: a short and thick stroke represents a short and steep slope, while a long and thin stroke represents a long and gentle slope.
4. The strokes are spaced at an equal distance inside a row.
5. The strokes have the same thickness inside a row.
6. If the map is illuminated, strokes are thinner and farther apart on the illuminated side.

The Swiss cartographer Eduard Imhof set five similar rules:

1. Hachures follow the direction of steepest gradient
2. Hachures are arranged in horizontal rows
3. Hachure length corresponds to the local horizontal distance between assumed contours of a certain interval
4. Hachure width is thicker for steeper slopes
5. Hachure density remains constant throughout the map area.

If the illumination is vertical, rule 5 is kept; in the case of oblique illumination, it is dropped. The rules above are to be obeyed for large-scale maps. If the map being drawn is a small-scale map (less than 1:500 000 according to Imhof), rules may be relaxed in order to obtain a more suggestive representation.

Hachures are still used today on large scale maps to show slopes, and on British Ordnance Survey maps and also in various countries' toposheets to show road and railway cuttings and embankments. On British OS maps they have become long triangles with the short base at the top, and always pointing downwards.

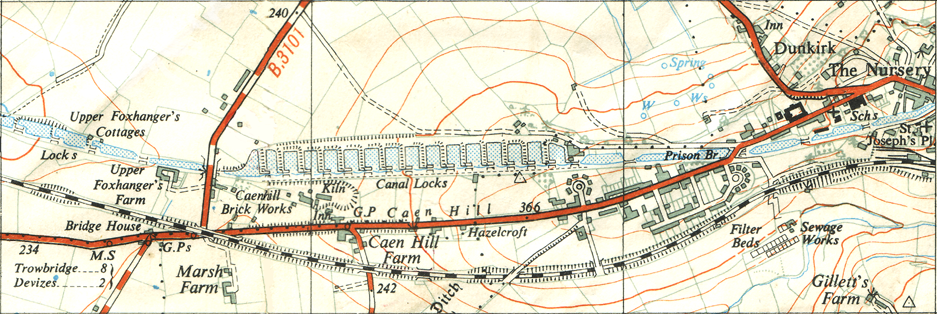
Hachures on an Ordnance Survey map, changing orientation as the railway passes through cuttings and along embankments
