= Alexander Georg Supan =

Austrian geographer

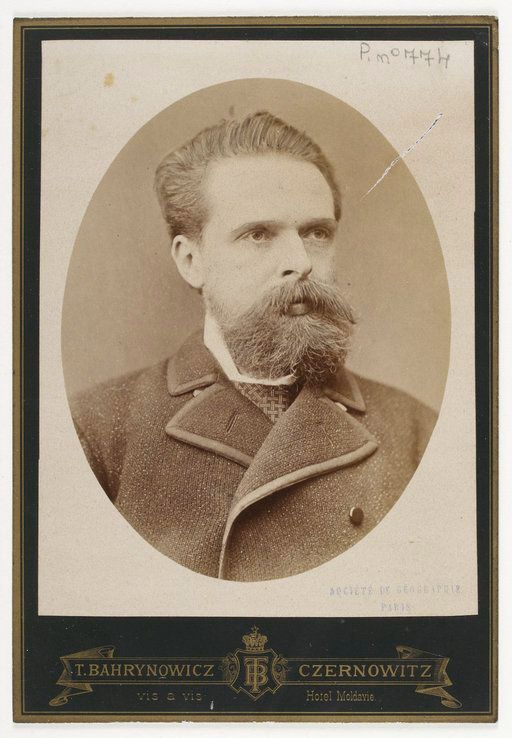
Photo of Alexander Georg Supan

Alexander Georg Supan (3 March 1847 − 7 July 1920) was an Austrian geographer.

== Biography ==
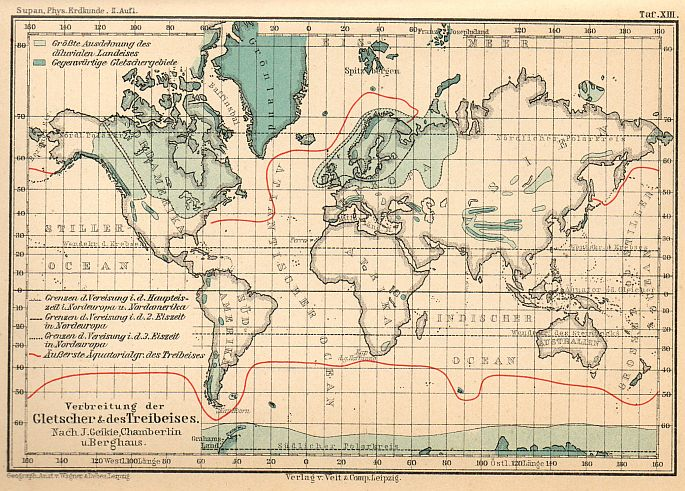
Distribution of glaciers and drift ice in 1896, from Supan's Grundzüge der physischen Erdkunde (Basics of Physical Geography)

Born in Innichen, County of Tyrol, Supan was first educated at the Laibach gymnasium. He studied at the University of Graz (1866–68) as a pupil of historian Franz Krones, then continued his education at the University of Vienna, receiving his PhD at Graz in 1870. From 1871 to 1875 he worked as a teacher in the Realschule in Laibach, and afterwards studied various sciences in Graz, Halle and Leipzig.

In 1877 he became a gymnasium teacher in Czernowitz, where in 1880 he was named an associate professor of geography at the university. In 1884 became editor of Petermann's Mitteilungen in Gotha, retaining this post until 1909, when he accepted the chair of geography at Breslau. He died in Breslau on 6 July 1920.

His original contributions to geographical science were mainly in the fields of climatology and oceanography. In 1889 he was named editor of the statistical calendar of the Almanack de Gotha.

== Works ==
- Lehrbuch der Geographie fur osterreichische Mittelschulen und verwandte Lehranstalten sowie zum Selbstunterrichte (1874, 10th edition 1901) – Textbook of geography for Austrian middle schools and related institutions, as well as self-instruction.
- Statistik der unteren Luftstromungen (1881) – Statistics of the lower air currents.
- Grundzüge der physischen Erdkunde (1884, 3rd edition 1903) – Basics of physical geography.
- Deutsche Schulgeographie (1895; latest ed. 1915) – German school geography.
- Die territoriale entwicklung der europäischen kolonien (1906) – The territorial development of the European colonies.
- Leitlinien der allgemeinen politischen geographie (1918) – Guidelines of general political geography.

He contributed many papers to Petermanns Mitteilungen.
