= Hermann Berghaus =

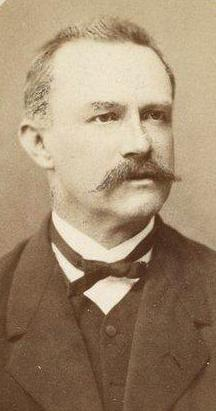
Hermann Berghaus.

Hermann Berghaus ( 16 November 1828 Herford, Westphalia – 3 December 1890, Gotha) was a German cartographer.

== Biography ==
He was a nephew of Heinrich Berghaus, with whom he had received in 1845-1850 his education at the Geographische Kunstschule (Geographical School of Art) . During most of his life, he was cartographer in the Geographical Institute of Justus Perthes at Gotha. His best known work is the Chart of the world which went through at least 12 editions between 1863 and 1924. He also prepared a Physikalische Wandkarte von Afrika (Physical wall map of Africa, 1881). He supervised the revision of his famous uncle's Physikalischer Atlas (1886), a project of many noted specialists. In recognition of his services to cartography, he was awarded an honorary doctorate from the Philosophical Faculty of the University of Königsberg as early as 1868. In 1881 he received the gold medal for special achievements from the cartographers' congress in Venice and in 1885 Ernest II, Duke of Saxe-Coburg and Gotha appointed him professor.

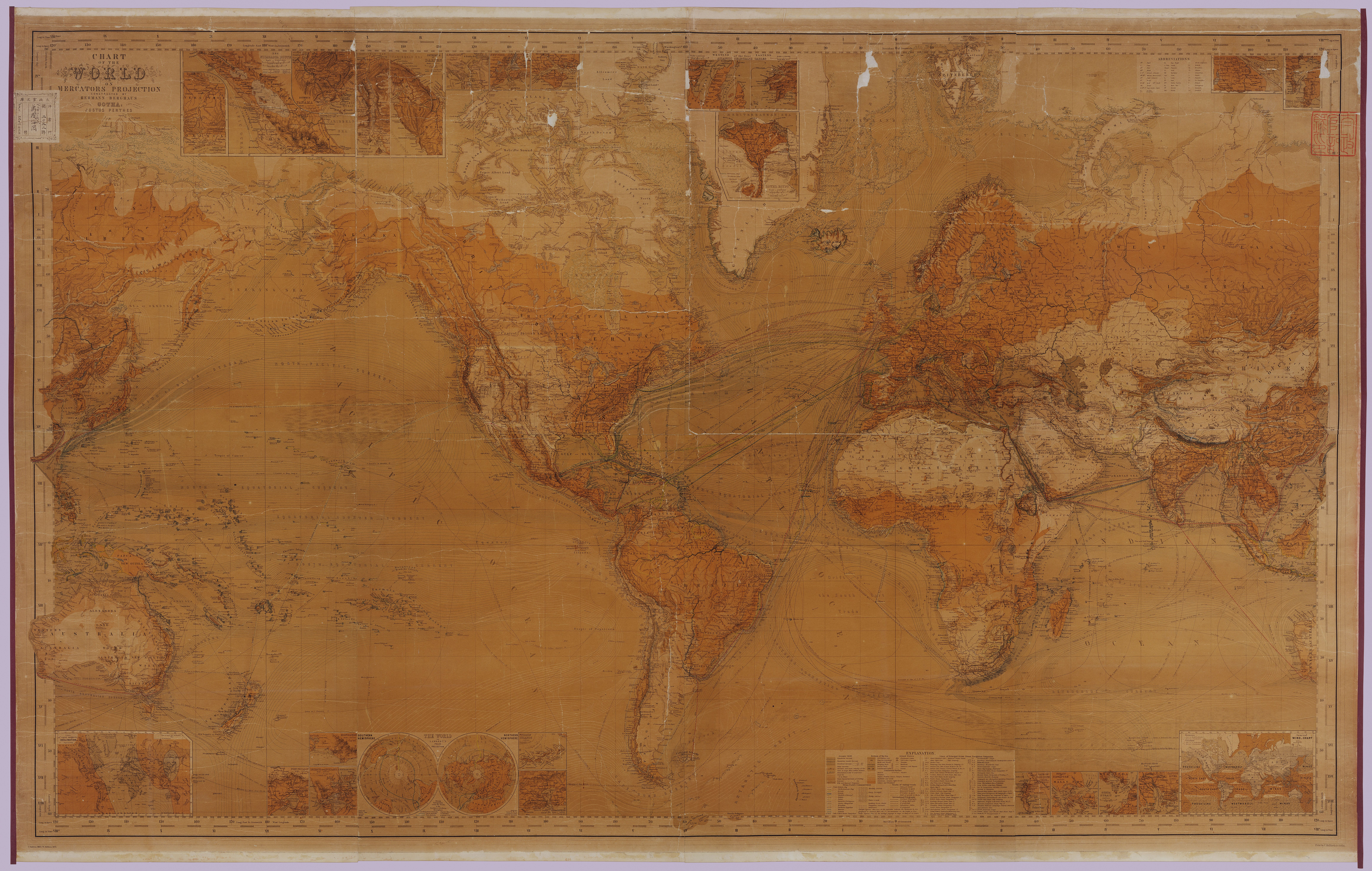
1871 Chart of the world on Mercator's projection
