= Christian Gottlieb Reichard =

German cartographer

Christian Gottlieb Reichard (26 June 1758 – 11 September 1837) was a German cartographer born in Schleiz, Thuringia. He studied law in Leipzig and subsequently became a city official in Bad Lobenstein.

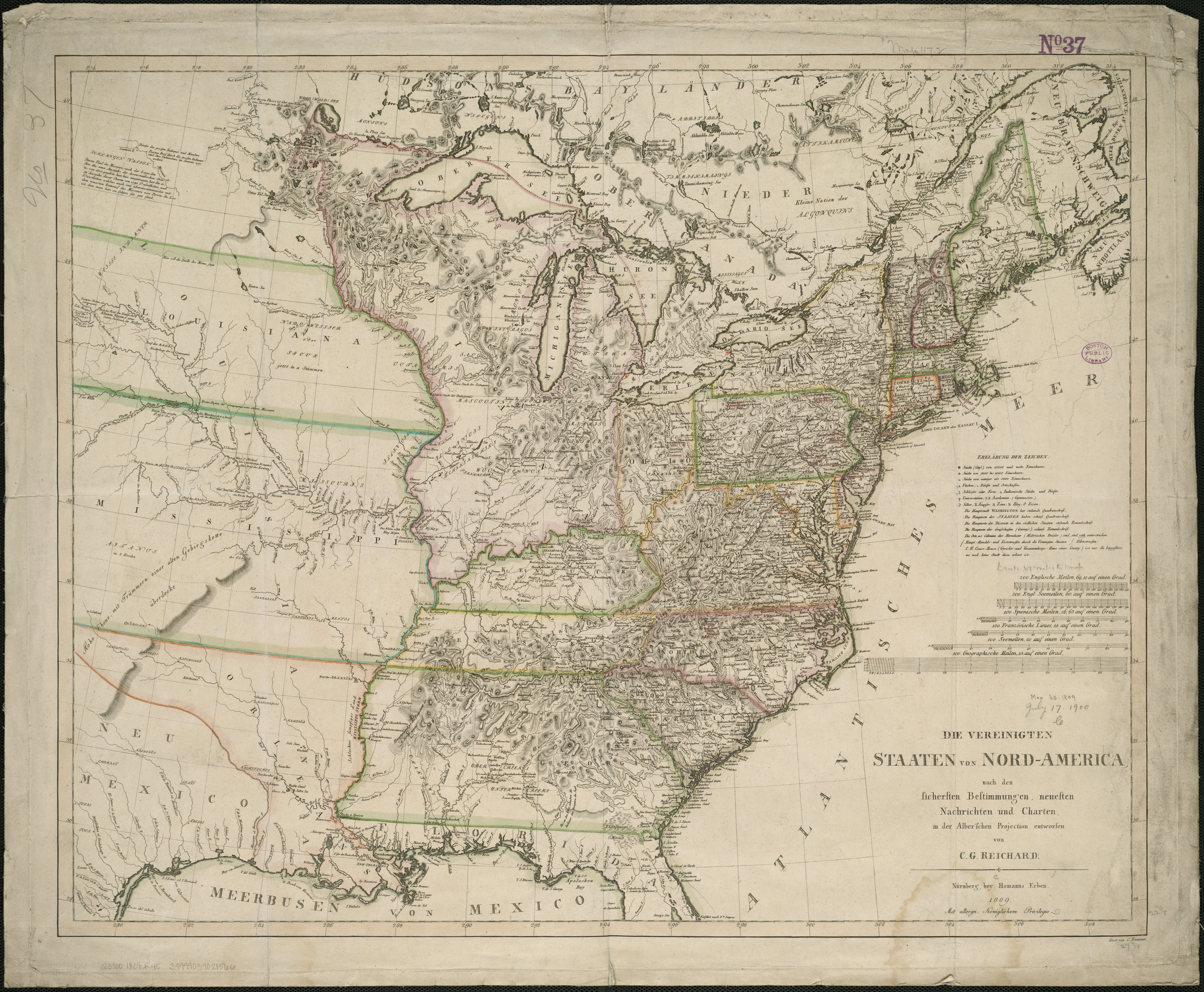
Reichard's map of the United States (1809).

With Adolf Stieler (1775-1836), he collaborated on the first edition of "Stieler's Handatlas", which was a 50-map project that was published between 1817 and 1823. Other significant geographical works by Reichard include:

- Atlas Des Ganzen Erdkreises in der Central Projection (contains a rare 1803 North Polar projection).
- Charte von Nord America: nach den neuesten Bestimmungen und Entdeckungen, (Weimar, 1804).
- "Map of the World after Mercator's projection"; 1825 (4 parts).
- "Orbis terrarum antiquus", 1824 (Atlas of the antique world).
