= Emil von Sydow =

German military officer, geographer and cartographer

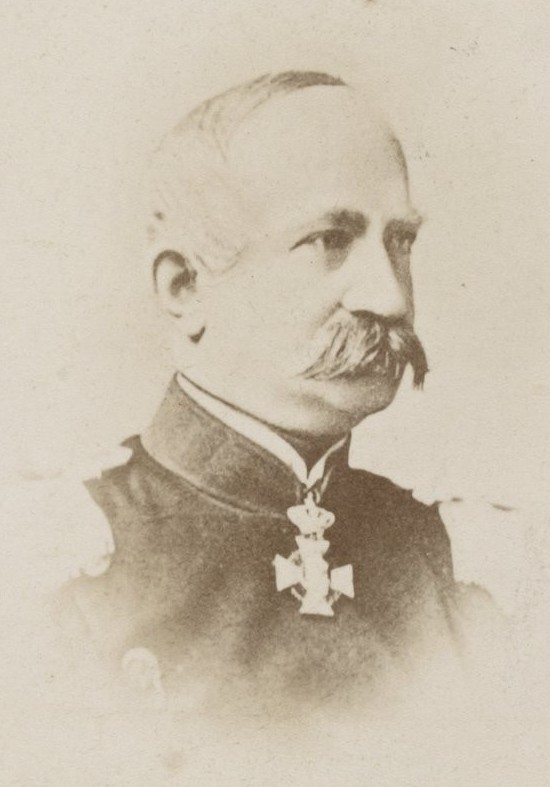
Emil von Sydow, 1873

Emil von Sydow (15 July 1812 – 13 October 1873) was a German military officer, geographer and cartographer born in Freiberg, Saxony.

Prior to 1843, he was a geography instructor at the military academy in Erfurt, afterwards being appointed as a member of the Ober- Militär-Examinationscommission in Berlin. In 1849, he began giving instruction in geography to Prince Albert of Prussia (1837–1906), and soon afterwards gave lectures on military geography at the Allgemeinen Kriegsschule. From 1855 to 1860, he performed geographical and cartological duties in Gotha, then returned to Berlin, where in 1867 he was appointed Abtheilungschef (division chief) to the Prussian General Staff. In 1870, he attained the rank of Colonel, and died three years later in Berlin due to cholera.

He is considered to be the founder of methodical school cartography, and distinguished himself by creating his own wall maps for classroom instruction. In 1838 he produced a physical map of Asia in his "Schulmethodischer Wand Atlas" (Methodic Wall Atlas for Schools) that was soon followed by maps of other continents. On these maps, Sydow developed a color methodology for landscape features using hachures, where green was depicted for lowlands and brown used for highlands. Wilhelm Perthes (1793–1853) of the publishing firm "Justus Perthes Geographische Anstalt Gotha" was impressed with Sydow's work and in 1849 produced the latter's "Schulatlas in sechsunddreigig Karten" (Schoolatlas in 36 maps), a work that eventually ran to 39 editions by 1887. The Drei Karten-Klippen generalized the knowledge of the projection of the surface of the sphere on the map, the representation of the three-dimensional Earth's surface on the two-dimensional paper and the selection and generalization of the map objects, basic questions that made Sydow pioneering.

After von Sydow's death, Hermann Wagner (1840-1929), a geography professor at Göttingen, designed the "Sydow-Wagner Methodischer Schulatlas" (Sydow-Wagner Methodical School Atlas) with 60 major and 50 inset maps.
