= Adolf Stieler =

German cartographer and publisher

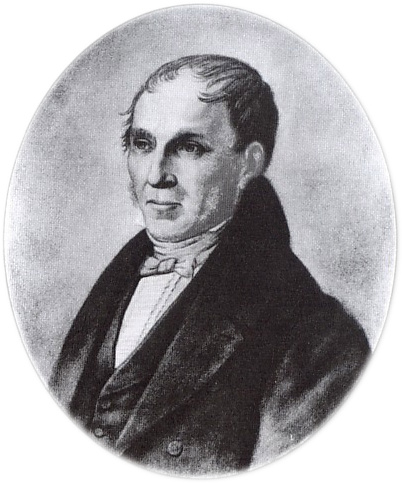
- Born: 26 February 1775; Gotha, Saxe-Gotha-Altenburg
- Died: 13 March 1836 (aged 61); Gotha, Saxe-Coburg and Gotha
- Occupations: Lawyer, cartographer
- Organization: Justus Perthes Geographical Institute
- Known for: Stielers Handatlas

Adolf Stieler (26 February 1775 – 13 March 1836) was a German cartographer and lawyer who worked most of his life in the Justus Perthes Geographical Institute in Gotha. Although he studied law and would serve in government for his entire career, he maintained an interest in cartography and published many famous works. His Handatlas was the leading German world atlas until the middle of the 20th century.

== Education and government career ==
Stieler spent much of his early youth in Gotha, where his father was the mayor. In his adolescence, he showed an affinity for map-making, an interest he maintained throughout his adult life. However, he studied law at the University of Jena and the University of Göttingen from 1793 to 1796.

He served as a legation councillor in Gotha from 1813 to 1829, and served the remainder of his career as a counsel to the local government until his retirement in 1835.

== Works and adult life ==
=== Cartography ===
Stieler's cartographic career began with a position as a geography teacher at a girls' school in Gotha. However, he began work with Franz Xaver von Zach, the director of the Gotha Observatory. His works during this period include publishing cartographic representations of a number of von Zach's observations. Such illustrations were completed in von Zach's "Allgemeinen Geographischen Ephemeriden" or "General Geographical Ephemeris," published in 1798.

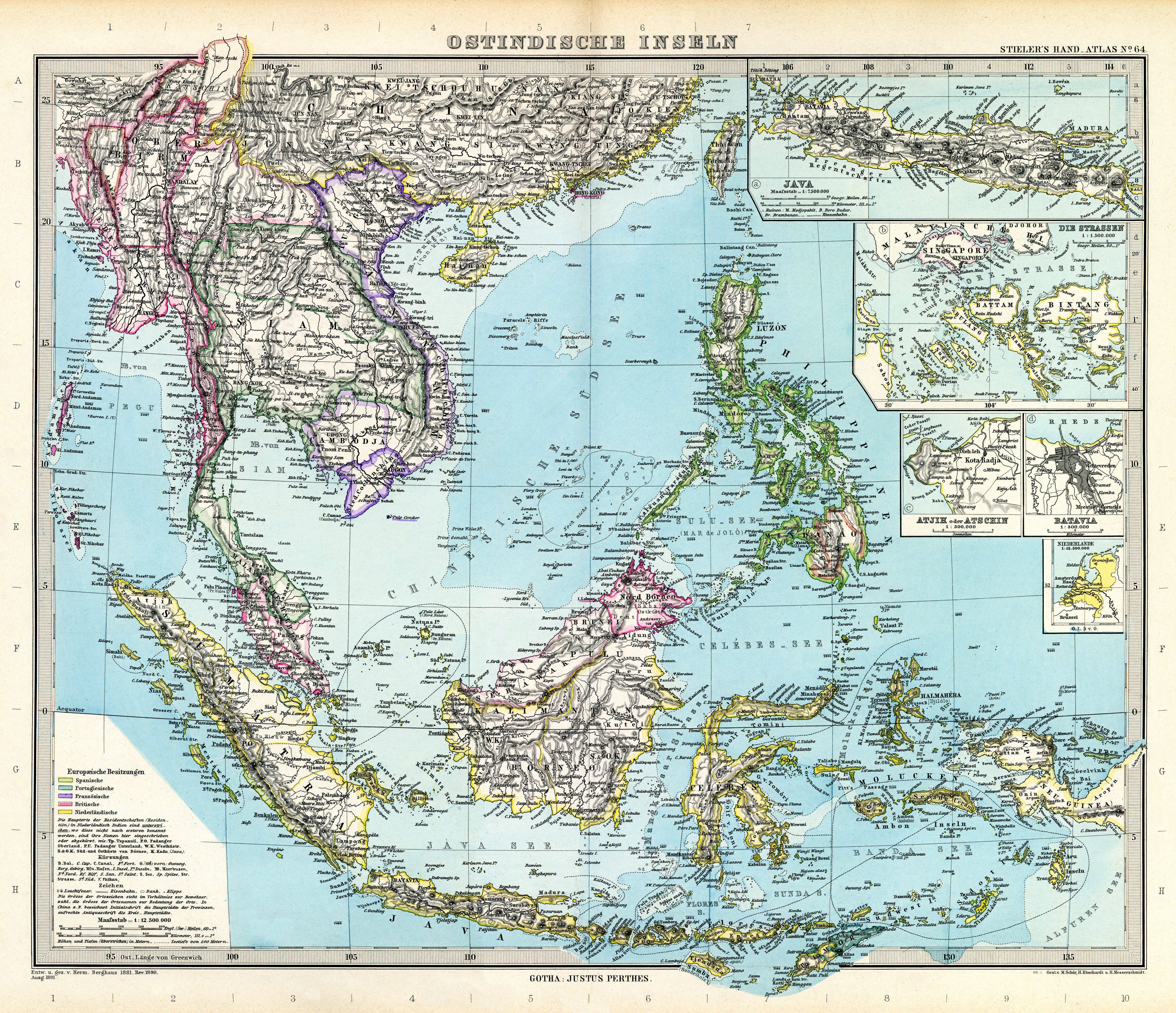
Map of Southeast Asia, printed in Stielers Handatlas.

In 1804, Stieler worked in the Geographical Institute of Weimar, continuing his goal of starting a geographical publishing business.

He also produced a number of regional and international maps. With von Zach, Stieler published his "Atlas Gaspari," which included maps of many European nations, including Spain, Portugal, and England. In 1806, his map of the East Indies was published. Later he would publish a 25 sheet military map of Germany that was part of a larger 204 sheet work. His maps were well known for their inclusion of new information from exploration and culture. He also incorporated a "System der fortwährenden Modernisierung," or "System of Ongoing Modernization," in his map creation and issuing.

However, he began work on his most famous and long-lasting work, the Handatlas, in 1816 after a long hiatus from cartographic work. By 1826, when he completed the Handatlas, his career was nearing its end. His 1836 map of Germany would remain unfinished.

=== Other works and later life ===
In addition to his contributions to cartography and law, Stieler also proposed mathematical methods in the insurance industry. He founded an insurance bank in 1828 with merchant and founder of Gothaer Versicherungsbank, Ernst-Wilhelm Arnoldi.

Stieler died on March 13, 1836, in Gotha.

== Legacy ==
Stieler had a significant impact on his contemporaries. Johann Christoph Bär, a protégé of Stieler's who also worked at the Justus Perthes Institute, continued much of Stieler's work after his death. Stieler's "System der fortwährenden Modernisierung" for maps was incorporated into Bär's Handatlas, completed with fellow cartographer Johann Friedrich von Stülpnagel. Bär's 1833 "Das Herzogthum Gotha und umliegende Länder" (The Duchy of Gotha and Surrounding Lands) also explained much of Stieler's style. Stülpnagel also supervised the completion of an edition of Stielers Handatlas.

The Handatlas became one of his most recognized and long-lasting works. Editions remained in print as late as 1945. Other works by Stieler also remained in print. The Neue Kriegskarte, to which he contributed, had an edition in print as late as 1904.

== Gallery ==
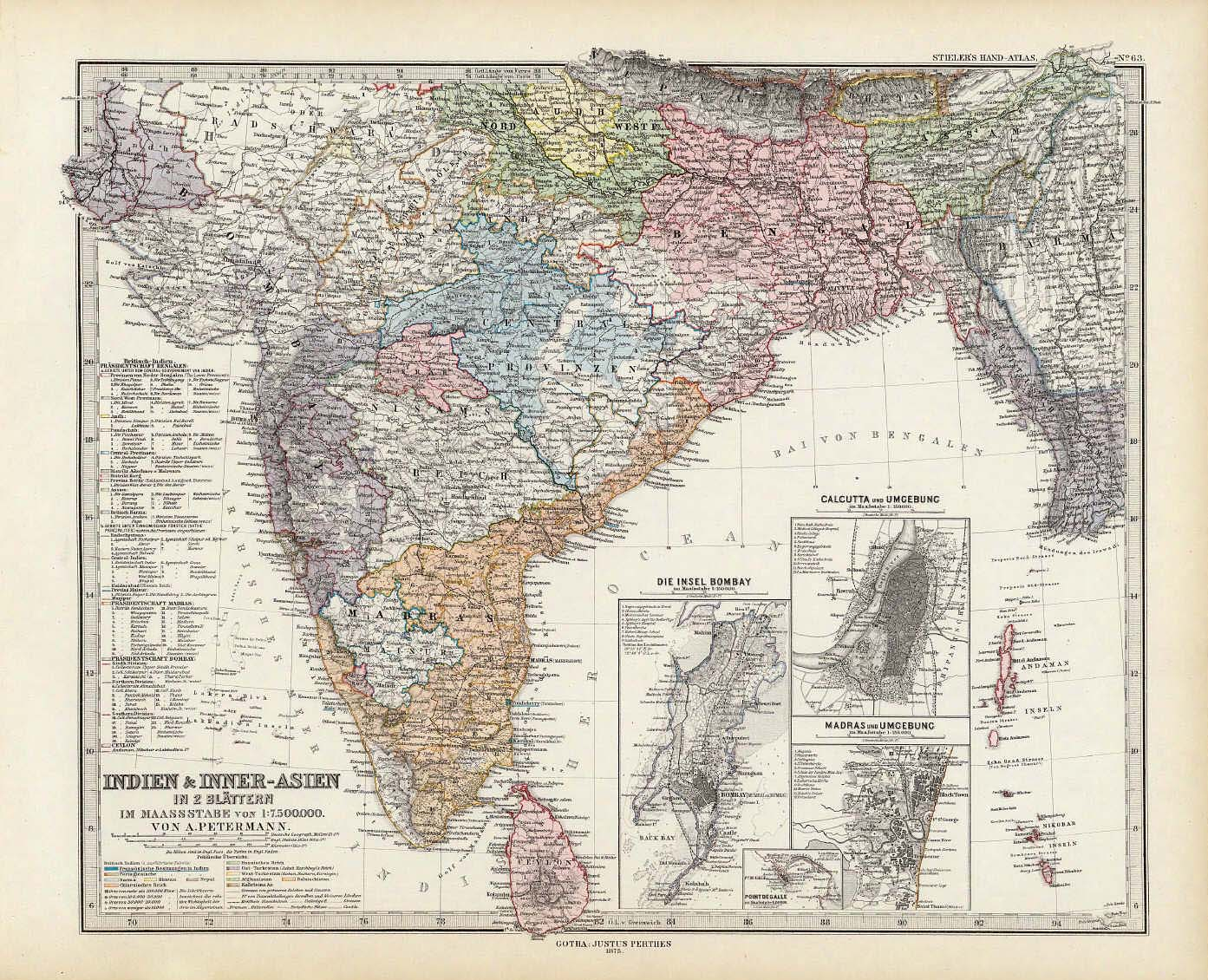
Map of India and Asia, Stieler's Atlas.

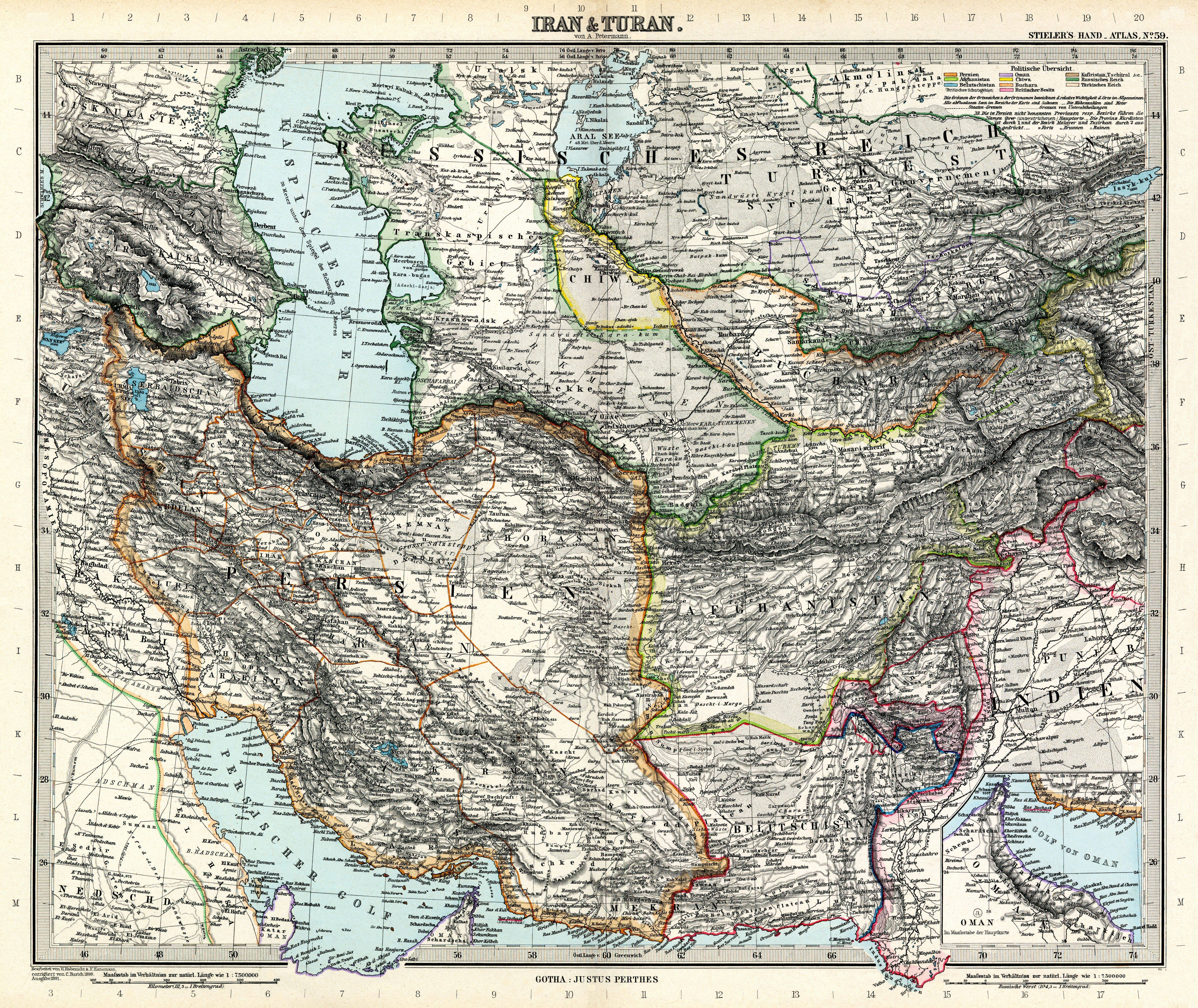
Map of Iran and Turan, Stieler's Atlas.

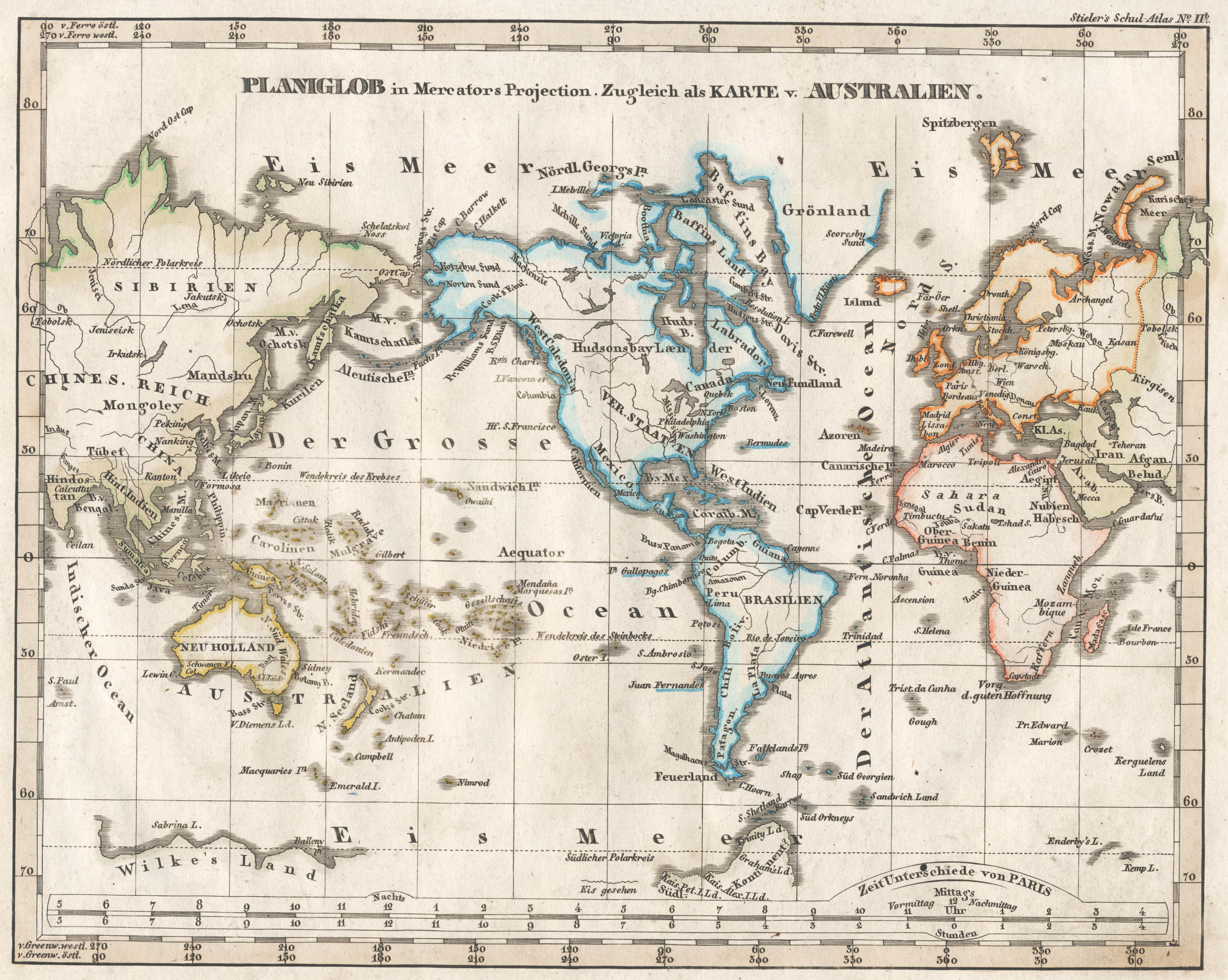
A mercator projection map of the World by Stieler.

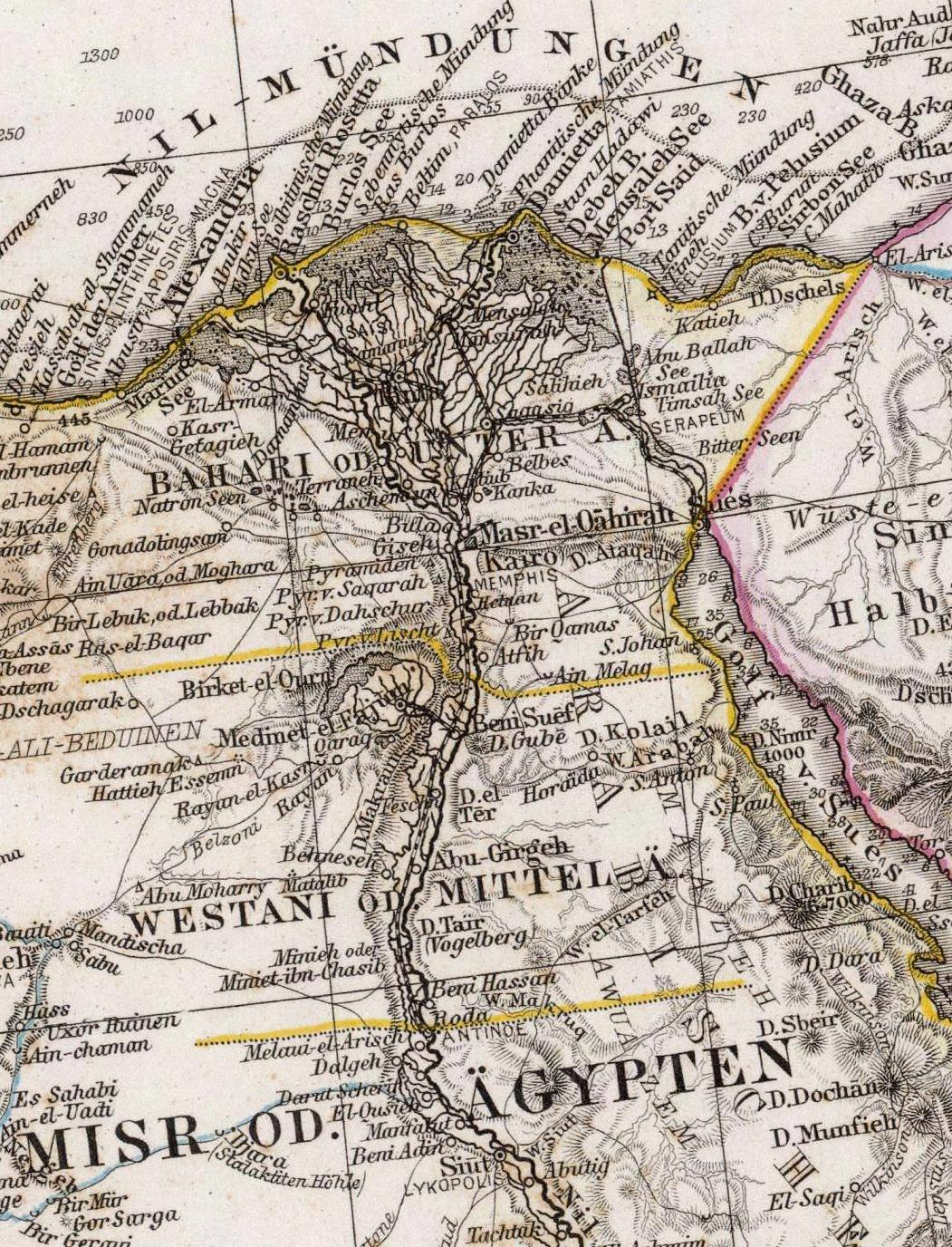
Map of Egypt by Stieler

== See also ==
- Stielers Handatlas
