= Hermann Guthe (geographer) =

German geographer (1824–1874)

Hermann Guthe (22 August 1824 – 29 January 1874) was a German geographer.

== Biography ==
He was born at Sankt Andreasberg in the Harz region, son of Heinrich Frederich Wilhelm Guthe (1796–1875), a merchant, and Wilhelmine Sophie Frederika Woge (1801–84). Guthe was educated at Clausthal gymnasium (1839–1845), Göttingen (1845–1847), and Berlin (1847–1848), where he was a pupil of Carl Ritter.

In 1849 he obtained an appointment as teacher in the Lyceum of Hanover, and subsequently taught mathematics at the Polytechnic High School of the same city. In 1873 he was appointed to the chair of geography at the Polytechnic Institute Munich. He died of cholera.

== Works ==
His geographical works include:

- Die Lande Braunschweig und Hannover mit Rücksicht auf die Nachbargebiete geographisch dargestellt (second edition, 1887; fourth abridged edition, 1890)
- Lehrbuch der Geographie für die mittleren und oberen Klassen höherer Bildungsanstalten (6th ed., 1894, et. seq.).
