= Ernst Behm =

German geographer and statistician

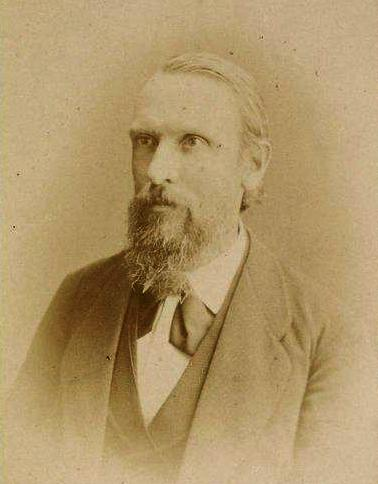
Ernst Behm.

Ernst Behm (4 January 1830 – 15 March 1884) was a German geographer and statistician who was a native of Gotha.

After leaving the Ernestine Gymnasium, Gotha, Behm studied medicine and sciences at the Universities of Jena, Berlin and Würzburg. In 1856, he began work at the Gotha-based Petermanns Geographischen Mitteilungen, a German language journal of geography founded by August Heinrich Petermann (1822-1878).

In 1866, he became editor of Geographische Jahrbuch (Geographic Annals, (bd. 1-66, 1866-1983), and from 1872, with Hermann Wagner (1840–1929), edited the geographical/statistical review, Die Bevölkerung der Erde. Starting in 1876, he headed the editorial staff of the statistical section of the Gothaischen Hofkalenders, and in 1878, following the death of Petermann, he became editor of Petermanns Geographischen Mitteilungen.

In 1872, Behm published an article (Beweise für die Identität des Lualaba mit dem Congo; English: "Evidence for the Identity of Lualaba river with Congo river"), which scientifically demonstrated that the Lualaba was a headstream of the Congo River. This claim was later confirmed as factual by explorer Henry Morton Stanley in 1877.
