= Heinrich Petermann =

Heinrich Petermann may refer to the following people.

- August Heinrich Petermann (1822 – 1878), German cartographer
- Julius Heinrich Petermann (1801 – 1876), German Orientalist
