= Lake Uniamési =

- Location within Africa
- Location: Central East Africa
- Coordinates: 6°S 27°E
- Primary outflows: Benue, Congo, Nile, Zambezi

Lake Uniamési or the Uniamesi Sea was the name given by missionaries in the 1840s and 1850s to a huge lake or inland sea that was supposed to lie within a region of Central East Africa with the same name.

Three missionaries, confined to the coastal belt, heard of the region of Unyamwezi in the northwest of what is now Tanzania and exaggerated its size to include a large part of the continental interior. They heard of a great lake, and imagined an enormous lake that would be the source of the Benue, Nile, Zambezi and Congo rivers. They drew a map showing a huge "Lake Uniamesi" that was published in 1855. The map spurred the expedition of Burton and Speke to investigate the African Great Lakes region, where they found that lakes Victoria, Tanganyika and Nyasa were separate bodies of water. It was not until 1877 that it was confirmed that these lakes did feed the Nile, Congo and Zambezi, albeit separately.

== Background ==
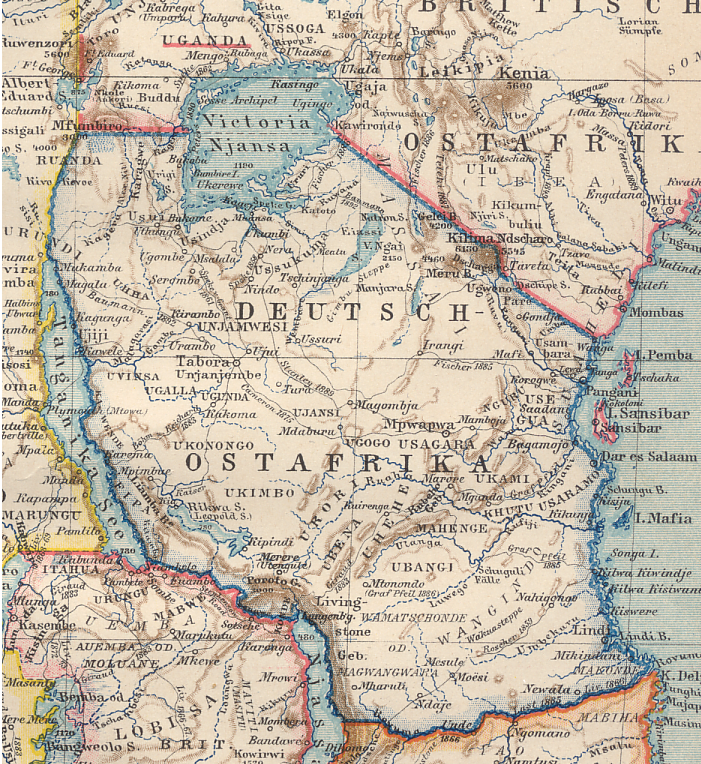
German East Africa in 1894, showing lakes Nyasa, Tanganyika and Victoria. "Unjamwesi" is below the "D" in "Deutsch Ostafrika"

The Great Lakes of East Africa include lakes Albert, Edward, Kivu and Tanganyika, all of which lie in the western or Albertine branch of the East African rift system, Lake Victoria to the east of this chain and Lake Nyasa (Malawi) to the south. Lake Victoria is the third largest lake in the world, and lies on the plateau between the west and east rifts. Unlike the long, narrow and deep lakes of the rift, Lake Victoria is wide and relatively shallow.

Bantu peoples moved into the region between the Great Lakes and the Indian Ocean some time after 1000 BC and mingled with the local population. By the first century AD ships from the Arabian peninsula were trading along the East African coast. Muslim Arabs from Oman began to colonize the coast in the 8th century AD. The coastal Bantu peoples intermarried with the Arabs to form the Swahili people, with a language that combines Bantu, Arabic and Persian elements. The Swahili culture incorporated many Arabic and Islamic aspects, while remaining essentially Bantu in nature.

The Unyamwezi region lies around the modern town of Tabora, between the coast and Lake Tanganyika, and includes the Tabora, Nzega and Kahama districts of the western plateau of modern Tanzania. In the 19th century the inhabitants were called Nyamwezi people by outsiders, although this term covered various different groups. Unyamwezi lay at a juncture where a trade route from the coast split, with one branch continuing west to the port of Ujiji on Lake Tanganyika while another branch led north to the kingdoms of Buganda and Bunyoro. Coastal traders settled in Unyamwezi, some with hundreds of well-armed retainers. The Nyamwezi provided most of the porters for the caravans organized by the coastal Arabs and Swahilis, and also conducted their own caravans. The Nyamwezi were long-distance traders throughout East Africa.

Ivory was not widely used by the Nyamwezi, but at some point they became aware that there was an overseas market for the product, and began to carry ivory along the route from Tabora down to the Indian Ocean coast opposite Zanzibar. There are records of Sultan Sayyid Said of Zanzibar negotiating with envoys from Unyamwezi in 1839 for safe passage for caravans to the interior. The Nyamwezi did not sell their own people as slaves, since they needed manpower for the ivory trade, but after the 1850s the slave trade began to become important. Slaves brought from the Congo Basin or the Great Lakes region would be held at Tabora, then sent down to the coast in small groups for onward shipment.

== Early European contacts ==
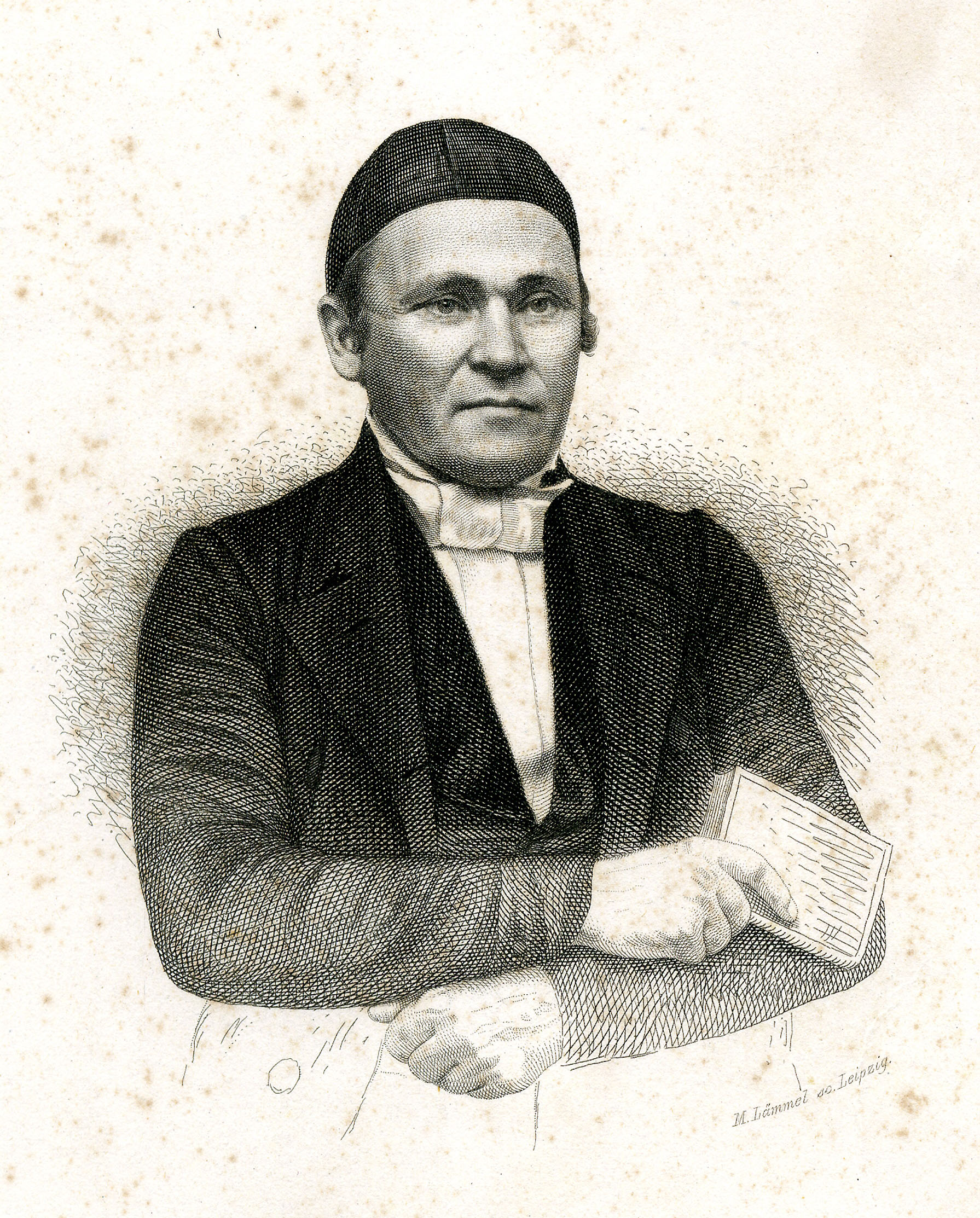
Johann Ludwig Krapf

Early in 1844 Sultan Sayyid Said gave the German missionary Johann Ludwig Krapf (1810–1881) permission to establish a mission on the coast. Krapf arrived in Mombasa on 13 March 1844. He was joined in 1846 by Johannes Rebmann (1820–1876). On 12 November 1848 Rebmann started a journey into the interior. The Church Missionary Intelligencer reported that, "The ultimate object, which our Missionaries had in view, has been to reach Uniamési, that interior country where the roads to East Africa and West Africa diverge." Uniamési was said to lie about 150 to 200 hours to the west of the Chagga kingdom, which lay on the slopes of Mount Kilimanjaro.

On 10 June 1849 Jakob Erhardt (1823–1901) and John Wagner arrived at the Rabbai Mpia mission station near Mombasa. Wagner died on 1 August 1849. In the spring of 1850 Erhardt and Krapf traveled by dhow down the East African coast from Mombasa. On the journey they met traders from Unyamwezi. Krapf recorded that caravans of three to four thousand men from Unyamwezi would arrive at the coast in December after a three-month journey, and would leave on the return journey in March or April. The Arabs of Zanzibar were hostile to Europeans reaching Unyamwezi. In 1847 they arranged for Washenzis to kill a French trader, Mr. Maison, on his way to the interior. (Note: "Washenzi" was a derogatory term used by the coastal Arabs for people of the interior who had failed to adopt any elements of Arab culture. It signified "barbaric savage".)

The missionaries were impatient to learn more about "the great central country of Uniamési, whither converge the great rivers which have their embouchures on the western and eastern coasts... from which, according to the native conception, is an outlet to the four quarters of the globe." There seemed to be "no doubt that the Natives of this central land traffic with the western as well as the eastern coast." In 1850 Krapf exclaimed that, "Had we sufficient pecuniary means at our command, and were it not our bounden duty to subordinate all secondary objects to our chief vocation, which consists in the preaching of the Gospel, the map of East Africa would soon wear another aspect."

Krapf wrote, "I have lately perused a paper making the lake Niassa and that of Uniamesi appear as one and the same volume of water... from other native authorities I know at least that the Natives clearly distinguish between the Niassa and the Uniamesi lakes. But as I have made it a rule to distrust all native reports, until they be confirmed by personal observation, I shall say nothing more on this point." Later that year the Church missionary intelligencer published an account by Krapf of a journey to Ukambani (Note: Ukambani is a semi-arid region of today's Kenya, inland from Mombasa and to the east of today's Nairobi.) that he had made in November and December 1849. He speculated that the Niger and its tributary the Tshadda (Benue), the Congo, Nile and Kilimani (Quelimane – near to the mouth of the Zambezi) would all provide access to the center of Africa.

Uniamési was thought to contain a great lake. Krapf said,

"The sources of all these great rivers are not so distant from each other as our present geographical knowledge would make us believe... Certain it is, that he who reaches the sources of the Nile will have a more than probable chance of reaching the sources of the Tshadda, of the Congo, and of the Kilimani. All of them verge toward the equator—toward the extensive country of Uniamési, and the territories around Uniamési, which could be rendered by the interpretation "Possession of the Moon" ... I will ... simply remark, that the Tshadda, the Congo, the Nile, and the Kilimani rivers, either take their rise from the great lake in Uniamési, or very near to that lake..."

== Erhardt's map ==
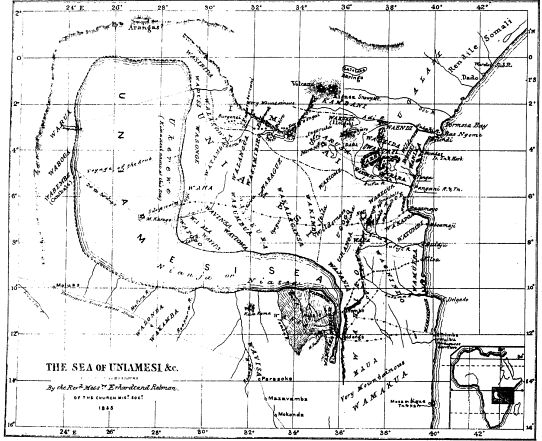
Erhard and Reibmann's map of the Uniamesi Sea as published in the Proceedings of the Royal Geographical Society

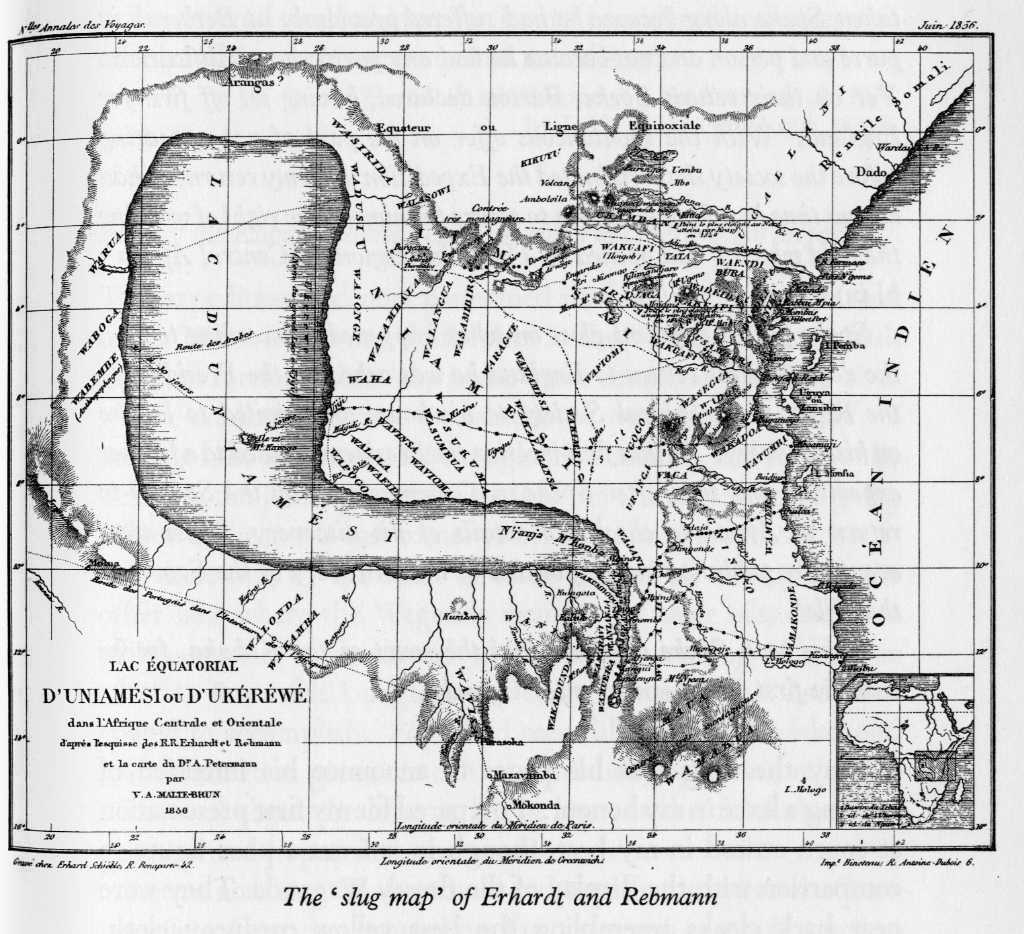
Map of Lac d'Uniamési by Victor Adolphe Malte-Brun dated June 1856, based on the Erhard and Reibmann sketch and on a map by August Heinrich Petermann

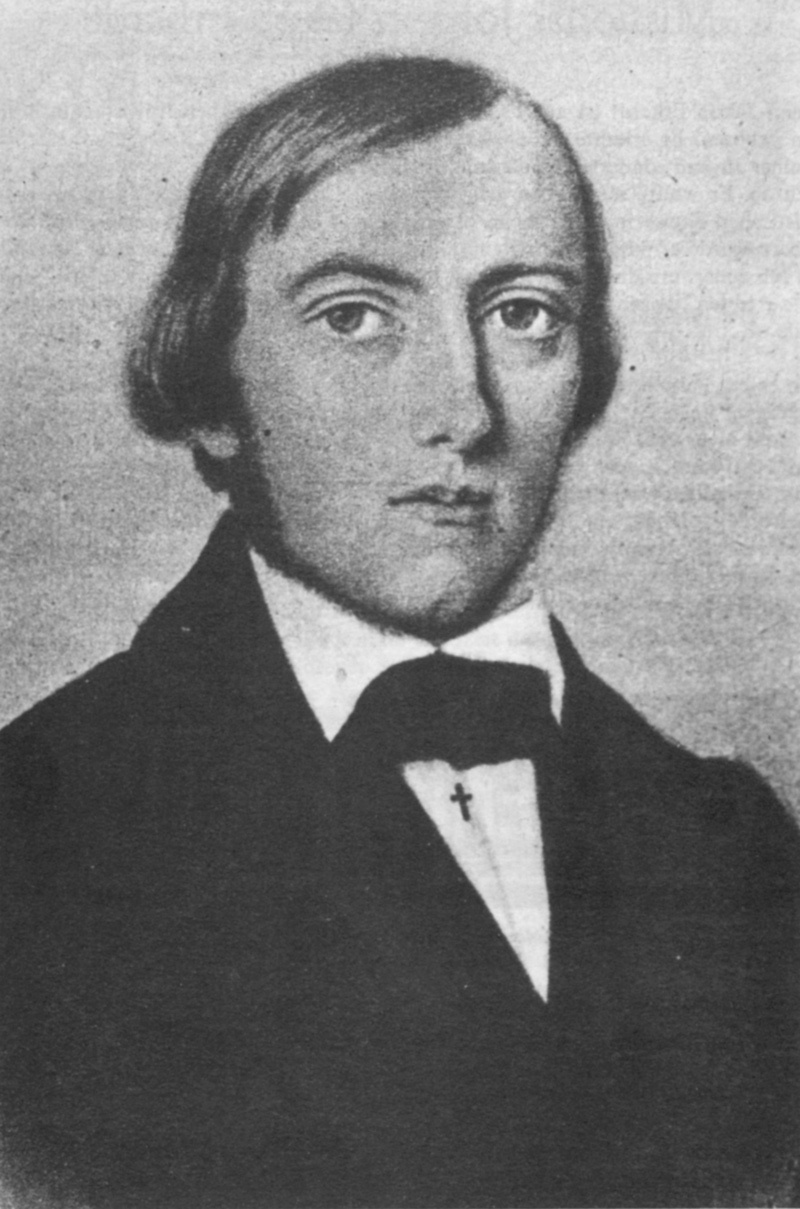
Jakob Erhardt

Jakob Erhardt spent six months at Tanga studying the Kisambara language, where he heard the stories of ivory traders who had visited the interior. According to Rebmann, whose account was published in Krapf's memoirs,

They represented to him that the Sea of Uniamesi was simply a continuation of the Lake Niassa, the latter, according to them, striking out westward from its northerly direction, and then spreading itself out even to a greater expanse than hitherto, so as to approach the mountains which pass through the centre of the continent, and form a most important and impenetrable barrier and water-shed. The northern side of this barrier contains the sources of the Nile, of Lake Tsad, and of the river Chadda, while the south side sends its waters partly to the Atlantic Ocean, by the river Congo or Zaire, partly to the Indian Ocean by the Jub, Dana and Osi, and also, as I think highly probable, to the great lake of the interior itself.

Erhardt was struck by the fact that various travelers who had gone inland from different points on the east coast of Africa had all come to an inland sea, and made a map based on available information, including the findings of Krapf and Rebmann. In November 1854 while talking about the problem to Rebmann, "at one and the same moment, the problem flashed on both of us solved by the simple supposition that where geographical hypothesis had hitherto supposed an enormous mountain-land, we must now look for an enormous valley and an inland sea." On the map that he and Rebmann drew the three lakes are shown as one very large S-shaped lake.

In 1855 Erhardt was repatriated due to poor health, and took the map with him. Rebmann wrote letters to the Calwer Missionary Intelligencer (Calwer Missionsblatt), received and published in 1855, in which he called the lake Uniamesi or Ukerewe. (Note: Lake Ukerewe is another name for Lake Victoria Nyanza. According to Burton the name came from Ukerewe Island.) He said that according to accounts by traders, considered trustworthy by the missionaries, the lake extended from latitude 0.5°N to 13.5°S and from longitude 23.5°E to 36°E, and had an area of 13,600 German square miles, as compared to 7,860 German square miles for the Black Sea and 7,400 for the Caspian. The map was first published in the Calwer Missionsblatt later in 1855, and then in the Church Missionary intelligencer in 1856. August Heinrich Petermann published the map in his Mittheilungen, but warned that the missionaries may not have accounted sufficiently for exaggeration by their informants. He provided a supplementary sketch showing the lake extending from 7°S to 12°S and 22.5°E to 30.5°E, one third of Rebmann's estimated size.

The map was reproduced with commentary in other publications.Ferdinand de Lesseps saw a pen-and-ink version of the map made by "Mr. Rehman of Moubar, on the Zanguebar coast." In a letter of April 1857 to the Académie des Sciences of Paris he commented that the inland sea would be larger than the Black Sea. He said, "The existence of this sea was certified to me during my stay at Khartoum by a pilgrim from Mecca, who inhabits Central Africa, and who gave Mahmoud Pasha, one of the Viceroy's ministers, particulars corresponding to Mr. Rehman's map. This pilgrim added that he had seen larger vessels on the Uniamesi than that in which he had sailed down the Red Sea."

The reports of snow on mounts Kilimanjaro and Kenya, near to the equator, caused considerable controversy. Sir Francis Galton, who had won the Royal Geographical Society's gold medal in 1853 for his southwest African explorations, had Erhardt's map published in the society's Proceedings. Galton was pressed to travel to Africa to confirm the report about Mount Kilimanjaro. He declined on the basis that he had not yet fully recovered his health from his previous expedition. Instead, the Royal Geographical Society persuaded the British government to provide £1,000 for an expedition by Richard Francis Burton and John Hanning Speke to investigate the great lake, or lakes, and determine if they were the source of the Nile. The map came to be known as the "slug map" from the shape of the Uniamesi or Niassa inland sea. Burton called it the Mombas Mission Map.

== Exploration ==
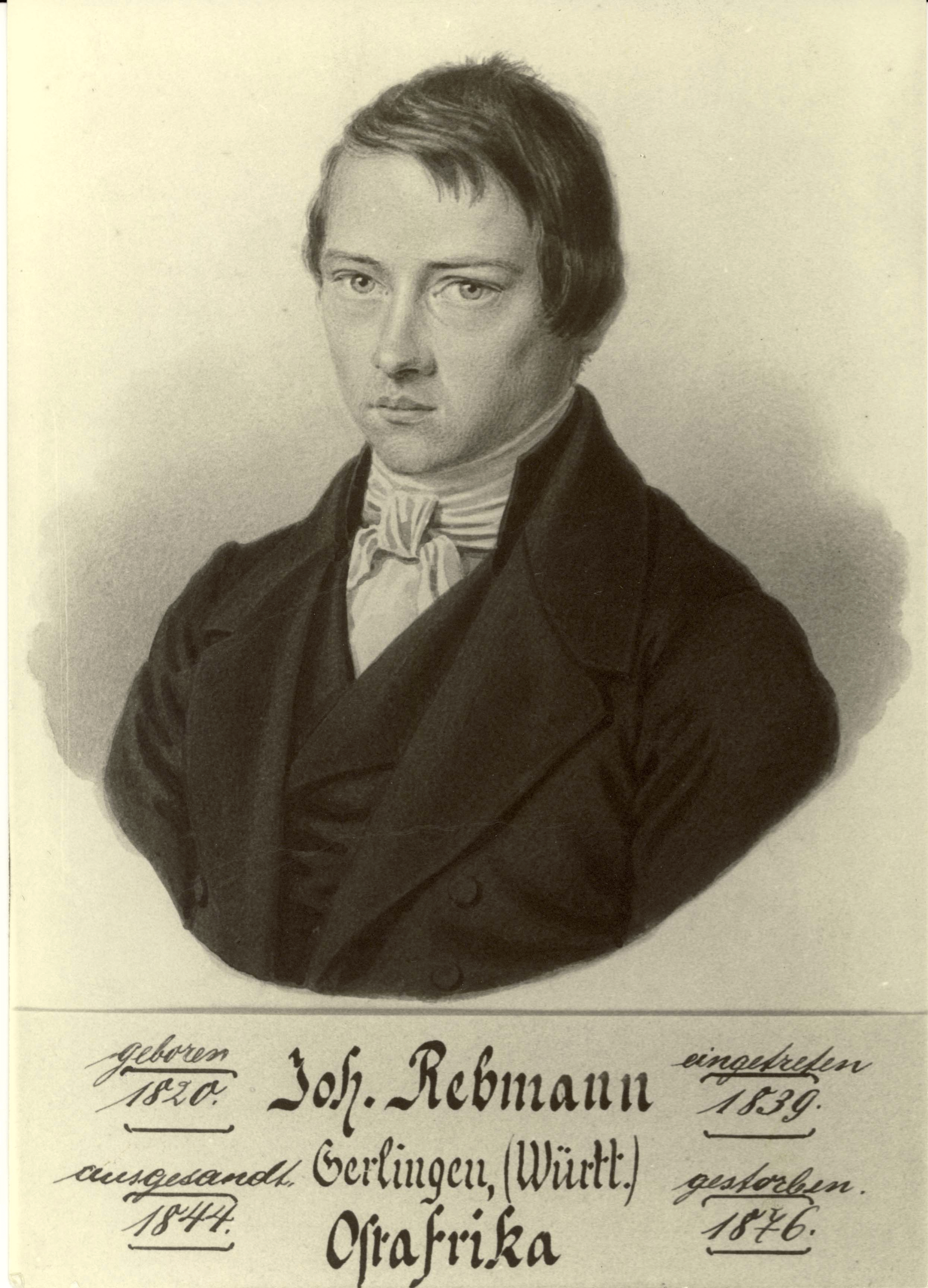
Johannes Rebmann

Burton and Speke reached Zanzibar on 20 December 1857, visited Rebmann at his Kisuludini mission station, and paid a visit to Fuga, capital of the Usambare kingdom. Burton met king Kimweri ye Nyumbai, once a powerful warrior who had controlled the trade routes to the interior but now extremely old. They left for the interior on 26 June 1858. After travelling through mountainous country they reached the inner plateau of Uniamesi. At the Arab trading post of Kazeh (now Tabora) they recorded an elevation of 3,400 feet (1,000 m).

At Kazeh Burton and Speke found a mixed population of Nyamwezi, Tutsi and Arabs engaged in cattle farming and cultivation of foods such as rice, cassava, pawpaw and citrus. Burton called Unyamwezi the garden of inter-tropical Africa. The land sloped down from there to Lake Takanyika [sic], or Uniamesi, which they reached on 3 March 1849 and where they recorded an elevation of 1,843 feet (562 m). (Note: Lake Tanganyika has a surface elevation of 2,536 feet (773 m) rather than 1,843 feet (562 m) recorded by Burton and Speke.)

Burton and Speke found that the lake extended about 300 miles (480 km) north from Ujiji, where it was closed by a crescent-shaped mountain range. They were told by the local people that the lake reached down to latitude 8° south. Later David Livingstone was given consistent information by an Arab trader who had skirted the south of the lake, and a Swahili traveler also confirmed that the "Taganyika" was not connected to the Niassa to the south. Burton and Speke returned to Kazeh, where Burton was forced to rest while Speke traveled north to explore Lake Victoria (also called Lake Ukerewe), reaching it on 3 August 1849. Speke recorded an elevation of 3,788 feet (1,155 m) (Note: Lake Victoria has a surface elevation of 3,717 feet (1,133 m), close to Speke's measurement of 3,788 feet (1,155 m).) and was told that a river left the north of the lake and flowed into the Nile.

There was continued controversy about the Great Lakes and the rivers that fed and drained them. Speke made a long journey with James Augustus Grant between October 1860 and February 1863, traveling from the coast opposite Zanzibar via Tabora and Uganda to Khartoum. However, the question of whether the Nile issued from Lake Victoria was left uncertain. In 1866–73 David Livingstone left the coast at Pemba, followed the Ruvuma River inland and walked to the southern end of Lake Nyasa, which he rounded to the west. He then traveled north to Lake Tanganyika. After lengthy explorations of the country southwest of Lake Tanganyika, with his health broken Livingstone reached Ujiji on the east of Lake Tanganyika, where he had his famous meeting with Henry Morton Stanley on 10 November 1871.

Verney Lovett Cameron was sent in 1873 to assist David Livingstone. Shortly after he left Zanzibar he learned that Livingstone had died, but continued to Ujiji. He circumnavigated Lake Tanganyika and found that it had its outlet to the west, feeding into a tributary of the Congo River. Cameron went on to the Atlantic, becoming one of the first Europeans to make an east-west crossing of Equatorial Africa. It was not until Stanley circumnavigated Lake Victoria in 1874–1875 that it was confirmed that the lake was the source of the White Nile. With Stanley's return to Zanzibar in 1877 the last of the main questions surrounding the Great Lakes drainage had been settled. Krapf had conjectured there was one great lake feeding the Congo, Zambezi, Nile and Benue. There had turned out to be three great lakes, feeding the Congo, Zambezi and Nile.
