= Johannes Rebmann =

German missionary and African explorer

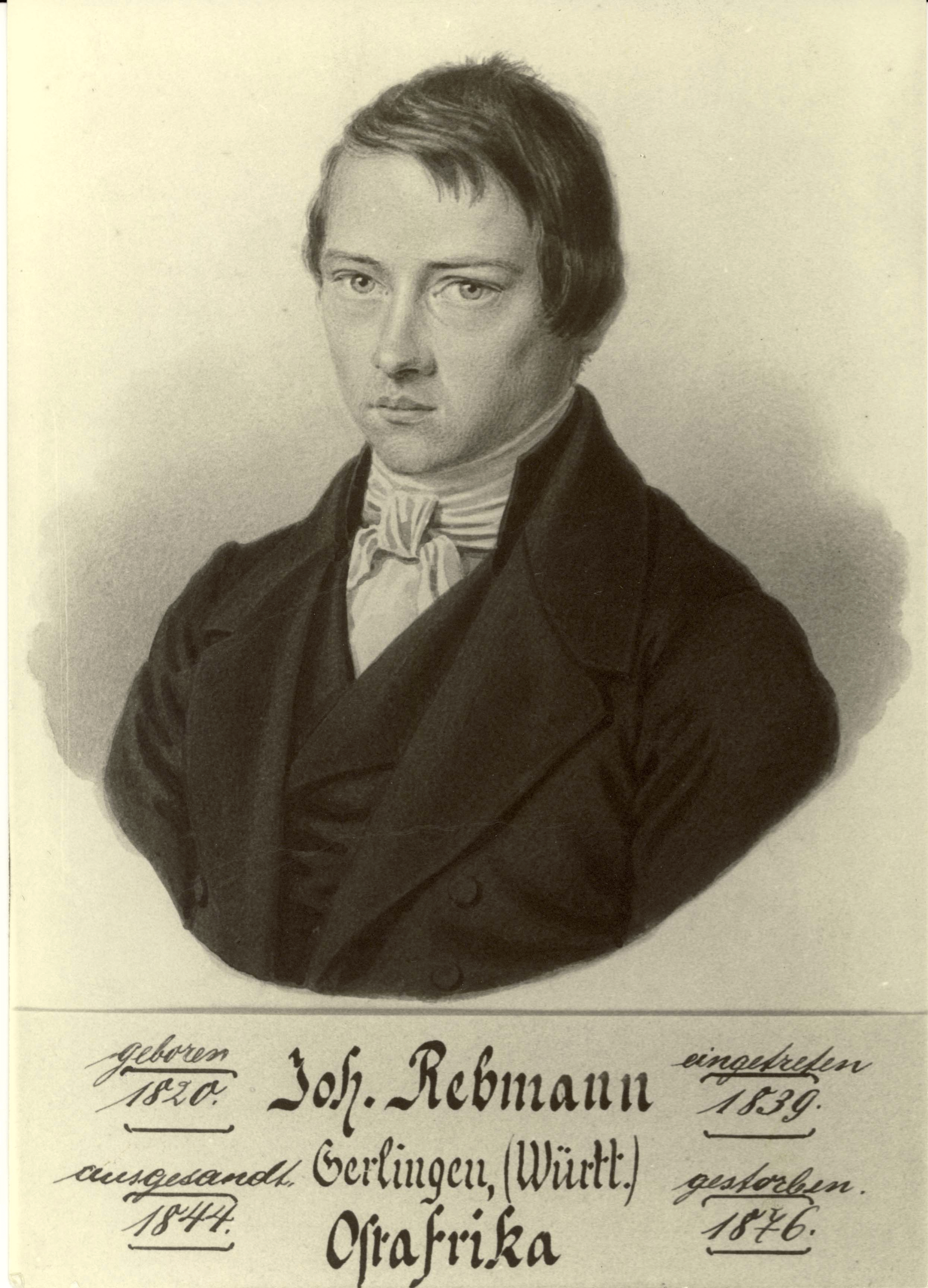
- Born: January 16, 1820; Gerlingen near Stuttgart, Kingdom of Württemberg
- Died: October 4, 1876 (aged 56); Korntal near Stuttgart, German Empire
- Occupations: missionary, explorer

Johannes Rebmann (January 16, 1820 – October 4, 1876), sometimes anglicised as John Rebman, was a German missionary, linguist, and explorer credited with feats including being the first European, along with his colleague Johann Ludwig Krapf, to enter Africa from the Indian Ocean coast. In addition, he was the first European to find Kilimanjaro. News of Rebmann's discovery was published in the Church Missionary Intelligencer in May 1849, but disregarded as mere fantasy for the next twelve years. The Geographical Society of London held that snow could not possibly occur let alone persist in such latitudes and considered the report to be the hallucination of a malaria-stricken missionary. It was only in 1861 that researchers began their efforts to measure Kilimanjaro. Expeditions to Tanganyika between 1861 and 1865, led by the German Baron Karl Klaus von der Decken, confirmed Rebmann's report. Together with his colleague Johann Ludwig Krapf they were also the first Europeans to visit and report Mount Kenya. Their work there is also thought to have had effects on future African expeditions by Europeans, including the exploits of Sir Richard Burton, John Hanning Speke, and David Livingstone.

Rebmann spent 29 years in East Africa. Much of his work there consisted in linguistic investigations, especially into the Swahili, Mijikenda, and Chichewa languages.

He returned to Germany only in 1875 for the final year of his life, by which time he had become blind. After entering into a brief second marriage, he died of pneumonia.

== Early life ==
Rebmann was born to a Swabian farmer and winegrower on January 16, 1820 in Gerlingen, Württemberg. The village he lived in was very small, with about 1,500 inhabitants. Even at an early age, he aspired to be a "preacher and canvasser of the gospel".

Later, when Rebmann became a young man, he chose to devote himself to being a missionary, and was trained in Basel. In 1844 he attended the Church Missionary Society College, Islington. The following year he was ordained as a priest by the Bishop of London and he became a member of the Church Missionary Society. Together with fellow missionary Johann Ludwig Krapf, Rebmann traveled in 1846 by a ship called "Arrow" to East Africa, where he worked in what is now Kenya, as well as at various other locations.

Their work was hard, and they had much trouble convincing tribal chiefs to let them speak to the people. Krapf noted (what he called) the "surge of Islam" that was going through Africa, and wanted to make some sort of Christian standing against its religious influence on the people of the continent. As the radius of the two missionaries' work expanded, plans for Christian missionary outposts in the area began to develop.

During his time in Africa, Rebmann kept a diary from 1848 until the end of his life. In the diary, Rebmann writes of the way his trust in his Christianity kept him stable in the continent of Africa, where only very few Europeans had ventured before him. An extract from the diary, which Rebmann in turn took from the Bible (Psalm: 51, 12) reflects Rebmann's belief in his faith: "Restore to me joy of your salvation and grant me a willing spirit, to sustain me."

== Stumbling upon Kilimanjaro and Mount Kenya ==
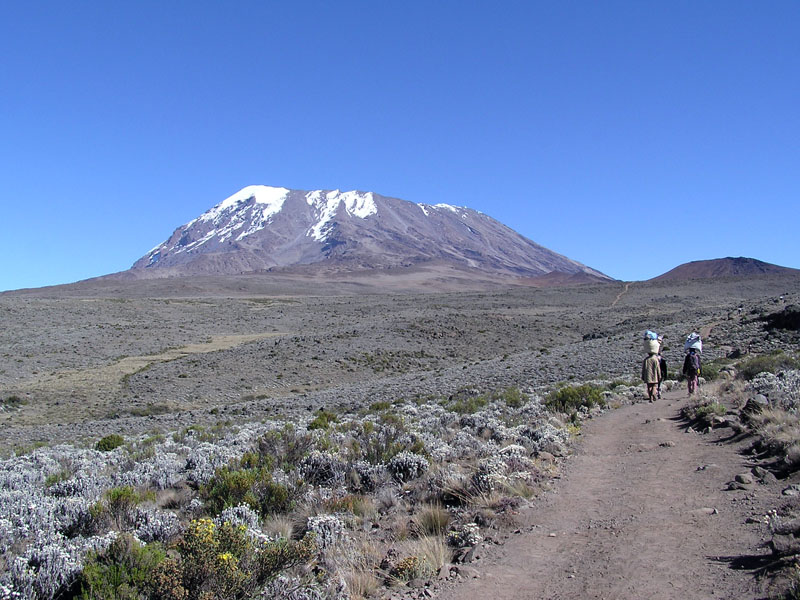
Kibo Summit of Kilimanjaro, the mountain on which Rebmann saw snow

In 1848, with the Swahili guide Bwana Kheri, Rebmann was the first European to see Mount Kilimanjaro. The following year, he saw Mount Kenya together with his colleague Krapf.

On the October 16, 1847, the two men set out for the interior of Kenya. With them came eight tribesmen and a local caravan leader named Bwana Kheri. This expedition was designed with the goal of establishing some of the first mission posts in the region. The journey was successful, and the group of tribesmen and the missionaries returned to Mombasa on October 27.

Sometime during their journey or their stay in the region, Rebmann and Krapf learned of a great mountain referred to as 'Kilimansharo', which reached the clouds and which was 'capped in silver'. The two men, like most Europeans at the time, were under the impression that snow and ice could not exist so close to the equator, and failed to realize the significance of the mountain being 'topped with silver'.

However, the two missionaries, who had become just as much explorers as they were missionaries, became quite interested in Kilimanjaro, and Krapf sought permission of the Mombasa governor for an expedition to the land of the Jagga, a people now known as the Chaga, who lived and live on the actual slopes of Kilimanjaro. Krapf told the governor that this journey would be work-based. Despite this, Krapf actually did not accompany Rebmann on the journey, so only Bwana Kheri and Rebmann left for Kilimanjaro on April 27, 1848.

Within two weeks, Rebmann and his guide were within sight of the mountain. He noted in his journal the strange white on the summit of Kilimanjaro, and he questioned his guide on what he thought it was. According to Rebmann's log, the guide 'did not know what it was, but supposed it was coldness'. It was then that Rebmann realised that Kilimanjaro was in fact capped in snow. In 1849, these observations were published, but the findings were not truly accepted by most of the scientific community at the time and even deemed as the result of hallucinations induced by malaria. On November 10, 1848, Rebmann recorded an entry in his log about the mountain:

This morning we discerned the Mountains of Jagga more distinctly than ever; and about ten o'clock I fancied I saw a dazzlingly white cloud. My Guide called the white which I saw merely 'Baridi,' cold; it was perfectly clear to me, however, that it could be nothing else but snow.

Mount Kenya was sighted by Krapf in the next year, on December 3, 1849. The finding of this mountain was also met with disbelief in Europe, but the effect of these sightings by Europeans was enough to trigger further investigation into other areas of Africa, thereby stimulating a growth of scientific (among other fields) knowledge of the regions, people, history, and geography of the African continent.

== Other work in Africa ==
Rebmann stayed in Africa for almost thirty consecutive years. He kept to a policy that, in order to truly affect the African people, and to complete his task as a missionary, much patience was needed. It appears that this policy was the driving force behind his many years of work on the continent.

As well as visiting Kilimanjaro, Rebmann and Krapf visited other areas of Africa, including the African Great Lakes and Mount Meru. He married a fellow missionary, Anna Maria, née Maisch, with whom he spent fifteen years doing missionary work in Africa before her death in 1866, and with whom he had a child (who died only days after his birth).

Also during his time in Africa he learned to speak several native languages, and completed a dictionary (started by his colleague Ludwig Krapf) of the Nika (Mijikenda) language, and a dictionary of Swahili (now lost, but of which some material may have been incorporated into Krapf's Dictionary of the Suaheli Language (1882)). He also translated the Gospel of Luke into Swahili. In addition, after meeting a Swahili-speaking slave known as Salimini, originally from Malawi, in 1853, he compiled the first ever Chichewa language dictionary, which was eventually published in 1877.

== Slug map ==
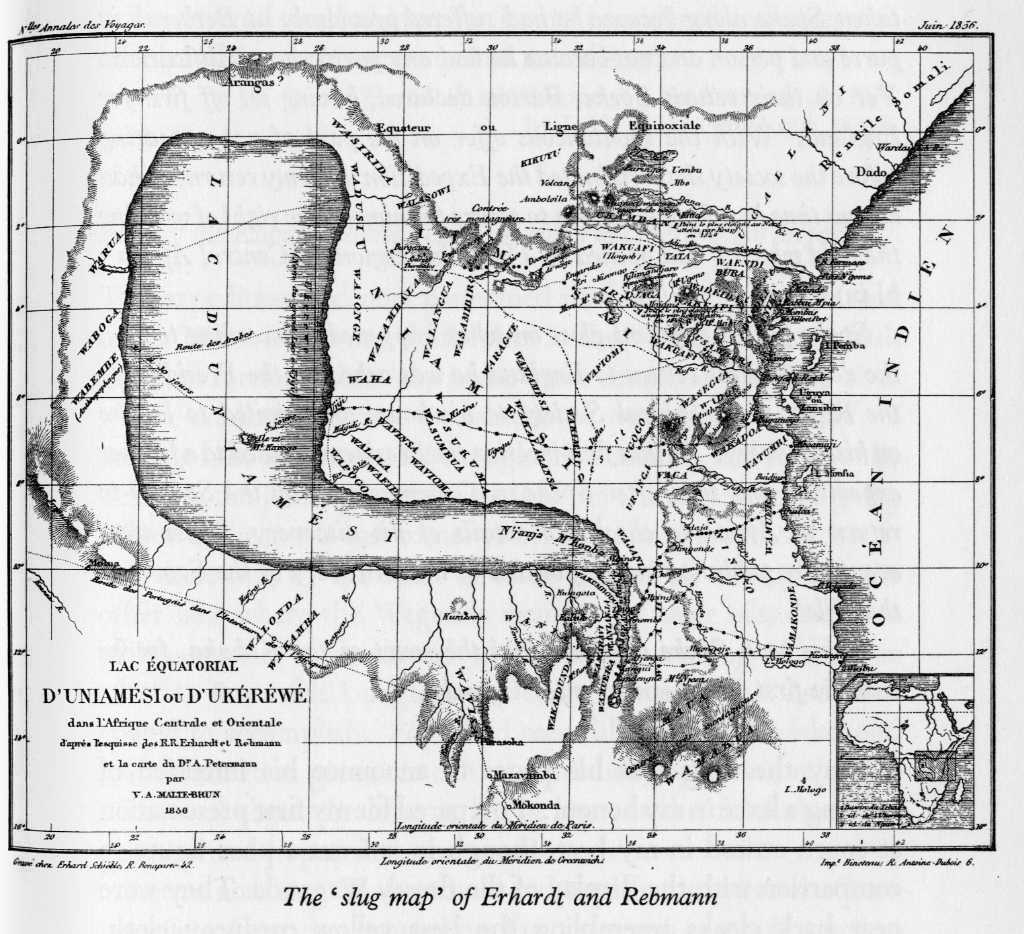
The Slug Map, illustrating some of the missionaries' findings

During their time in Africa, Krapf and Rebmann worked their way into the interior of the continent. They traveled to several areas in the regions of Central and Eastern Africa, including to what is now known as the African Great Lakes. The finding of one especially large lake (Uniamési) is depicted in a map known as the 'Slug' map. It was known by this name because the layout of the water body suggested a shape similar to that of a slug.

The basis for the map was prepared by the missionary Jakob Erhardt from the reports of his companions Krapf and Rebmann, and from verbal information that he had acquired from local people. Erhardt was struck by the fact that travelers who had gone inland from different points on the coast had all come to an inland sea. In November 1854, while talking about the problem to Rebmann, "at one and the same moment, the problem flashed on both of us solved by the simple supposition that where geographical hypothesis had hitherto supposed an enormous mountain-land, we must now look for an enormous valley and an inland sea."

On the map that he and Rebmann drew, the three lakes of Victoria, Tanganyika and Nyasa are shown as one very large L-shaped lake.

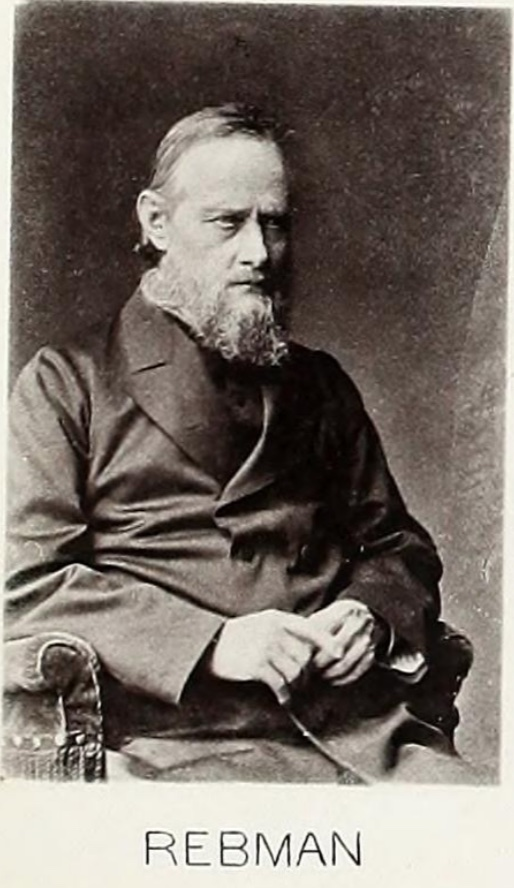
Photograph of Johannes Rebmann in old age, from Robert Needham Cust ‘A sketch of the modern languages of Africa’ (1883)

On the map, several subtle but interesting things can be discovered, including, in the northeast section of the cartograph, a reference to a stream flowing into Lake Victoria, then known by the missionaries as "the Ukerewa". A note describes how the waters of the stream were very sweet, but stained the teeth a sickly yellow. This note is probably the first known text referring to the drinking water, found primarily around Mount Meru, which has a high content of fluorine and causes a yellow-brown stain to the incisors which cannot be removed.

Another piece of writing on the Slug Map – "From where the Magad [soda] is bought" – provides evidence that the trade in soda originating in Lake Natron (obviously not known by that name then) was already active at that time.

In 1855 Erhardt was repatriated due to poor health, and took his map with him. It was first published in the Calwer Missionsblatt in 1855, and then in the Church Missionary intelligencer in 1856. The map is now in the care of the Royal Geographical Society in London. It is described by the Society as:

Sketch of a Map from 1°N. to 15°S. Latitude and from 23° to 43°E. Longitude delineating the probably position and extent of the Sea of Uniamesi as being the continuation of the Lake Niasa and exhibiting the numerous heathen-tribes situated to the East and West of that great Inland-sea together with the Caravan routes leading to it and into the interior in general. In true accordance with the information received from natives - Representatives of various inland tribes - and Mahomidan inland traders. By the Revd. Messrs. Erhardt and F. Rebmann Missionaries of the Church Miss. Society in East Africa Kisaludini March 14, 1855.

== Later life and death ==
Having almost lost his eyesight for unknown reasons, Rebmann went back to Europe in September 1875. He returned to Germany for the first time in 29 years after being persuaded to do so by a fellow missionary who was working in the area. He then proceeded to take up residence in Korntal near Stuttgart, where he was close to his old friend Krapf. In spring 1876, upon the advice of Krapf, he married the widow of another missionary from India, Louise Rebmann née Däuble. The marriage did not last long, as on October 4, 1876, Rebmann died of pneumonia. Engraved on Rebmann's tombstone in the cemetery of Korntal are the words (in English) "Saved in the arms of Jesus" (a photo can be seen here).

The legacy that he left behind him is preserved by the Johannes Rebmann Foundation, a religious society devoted to Rebmann and his memory. Rebmann's work in Africa, both as a missionary and as an explorer, allowed other Europeans to follow in his footsteps.

== See also ==
- Tanzania
- Rebmann Glacier - Glacier named after Rebmann
