= Jakob Erhardt =

Johann Jakob Erhardt
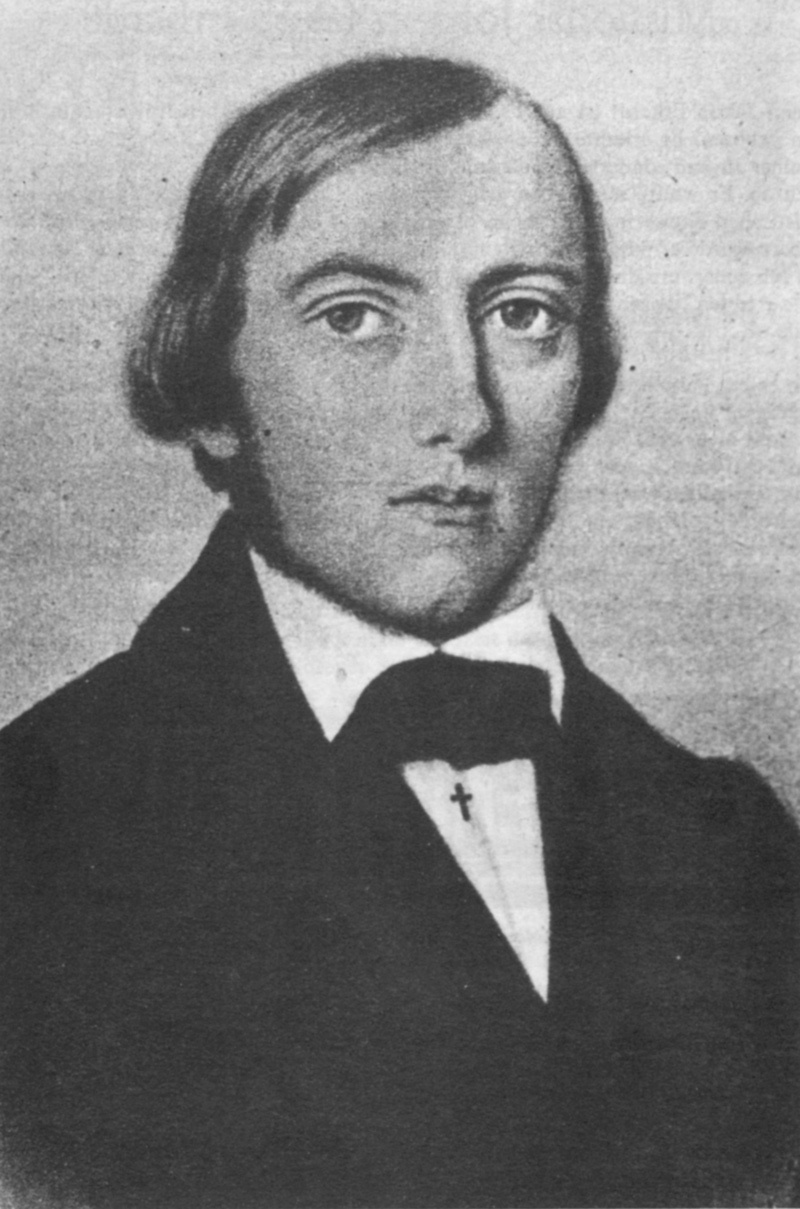
- 19th century print of Erhardt
- Born: 17 April 1823; Bönnigheim, Kingdom of Württemberg
- Died: 14 August 1901 (aged 78); Stuttgart, Kingdom of Württemberg
- Occupation: Missionary
- Known for: Map of East African lakes

Johann Jakob Erhardt, or John James Erhardt, (17 April 1823 – 14 August 1901) was a German missionary and explorer who worked in East Africa and India. Although he remained on or near the coast of East Africa, he contributed to European knowledge of the interior through gathering descriptions from local people who had traveled there. His map of the region stimulated dispatch of the expedition of Burton and Speke.

== Early life ==
Erhardt was born on 17 April 1823 in Bönnigheim, then in the Kingdom of Württemberg. He was the son of a master tailor, and was apprenticed to a cooper. He worked with the Boennigheim Pietists, then joined the Basel Mission, where he was trained as a missionary until 1846. From 1846 to 1848, he studied with the Church Mission Society in London, where he was ordained in 1848.

== East Africa ==
Erhardt was dispatched by the Church Mission Society to East Africa. On 10 June 1849 Erhardt and John Wagner arrived at the Rabbai Mpia mission station near Mombasa, where they joined Johann Ludwig Krapf and Johannes Rebmann. However, Wagner died on 1 August 1849. In the spring of 1850, Erhardt and Krapf travelled by dhow down the East African coast from Mombasa. The boat was small and food was scarce, poor quality and difficult to prepare due to the rain. However, they collected much information about the interior.

Erhardt and Krapf went via Tanga, Kilwa, Lindi and Mikindani to Cape Delgado. The two missionaries, the first Europeans to investigate the coast in such detail, went unarmed and with few escorts, and were generally given a good reception by the Arabs, Swahilis, and local people they met. They mapped the Pangani River's mouth, the delta of the Rufiji River and the Ruvuma River.

After the voyage, the two returned to the mission station, and in 1851 Krapf left for Europe to recuperate.

In September 1853, Erhardt visited Vugha in the Usambara Mountains, capital of the Shambaa ruler Kimweri ye Nyumbai, where he saw two witches brought in and executed. Erhardt recorded the repulse of a Maasai raid at Mazinde by an allied army of Shambaa under Semboja, Kimweri's son, and of Wazigua, Parakuyo and "Arabs" (most likely Swahili). Erhardt's journey took from 9 August 1853 to December 1853, and he spent three months with the king.

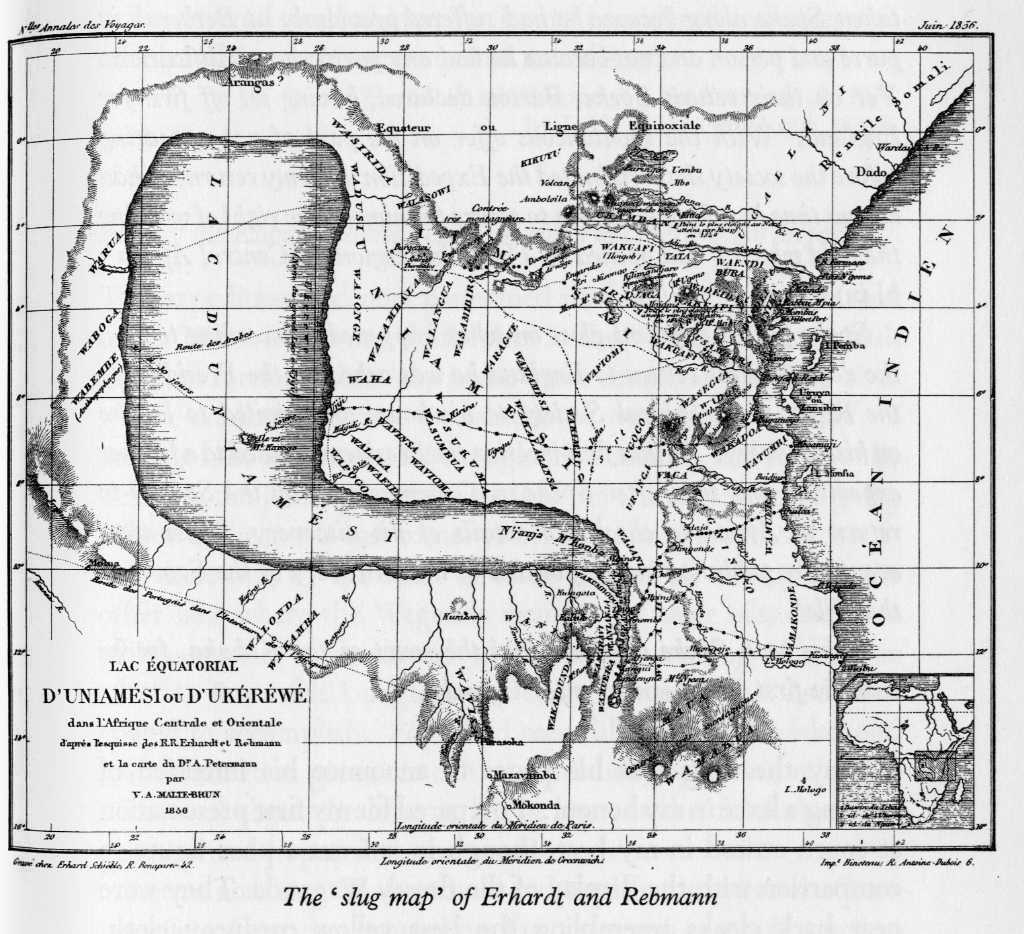
Map of East Africa by Victor Adolphe Malte-Brun dated June 1856, based on the Erhard and Reibmann sketch and on a map by August Heinrich Petermann

Erhadt spent six months in Tanga in 1854, where he studied the Shambala language. At Tanga, where caravans assembled before leaving for the interior, he learned of Ukerewe (Lake Victoria), Lake Tanganyika and Lake Nyasa, and heard of the city of Ujiji. However, he was told by ivory traders that the great inland "Sea of Uniamesi" was just a westward extension of Lake Nyasa, reaching close to the mountains that formed the spine of the continent.

Erhardt was struck by the fact that various travellers who had gone inland from different points on the coast had all come to an inland sea, and made a map based on available information, including the findings of his fellow missionaries Krapf and Rebmann. In November 1854 while talking about the problem to Rebmann, "at one and the same moment, the problem flashed on both of us solved by the simple supposition that where geographical hypothesis had hitherto supposed an enormous mountain-land, we must now look for an enormous valley and an inland sea." On the map that he and Rebmann drew the three lakes are shown as one very large S-shaped lake.

== Later career ==
In 1855, Erhardt was repatriated due to poor health, and took the map with him. It was first published in the Calwer Missionsblatt in 1855, and then in the Church Missionary intelligencer in 1856.

The map was reproduced with commentary in other publications. The reports of snow on mounts Kilimanjaro and Kenya, near to the equator, caused considerable controversy. The map caused the British government and the Royal Geographical Society to hire Richard Francis Burton and John Hanning Speke to investigate the great lake, or lakes, and determine if they were the source of the Nile.

The map came to be known as the "slug map" from the shape of the Uniamesi or Niassa inland sea. Burton called it the Mombas Mission Map.

Erhardt worked in India from 1856 to 1891. He died on 14 August 1901 in Stuttgart. Jakob-Erhardt-Straße carries his name in Boennigheim.
