= August Heinrich Petermann =

German cartographer (1822–1878)

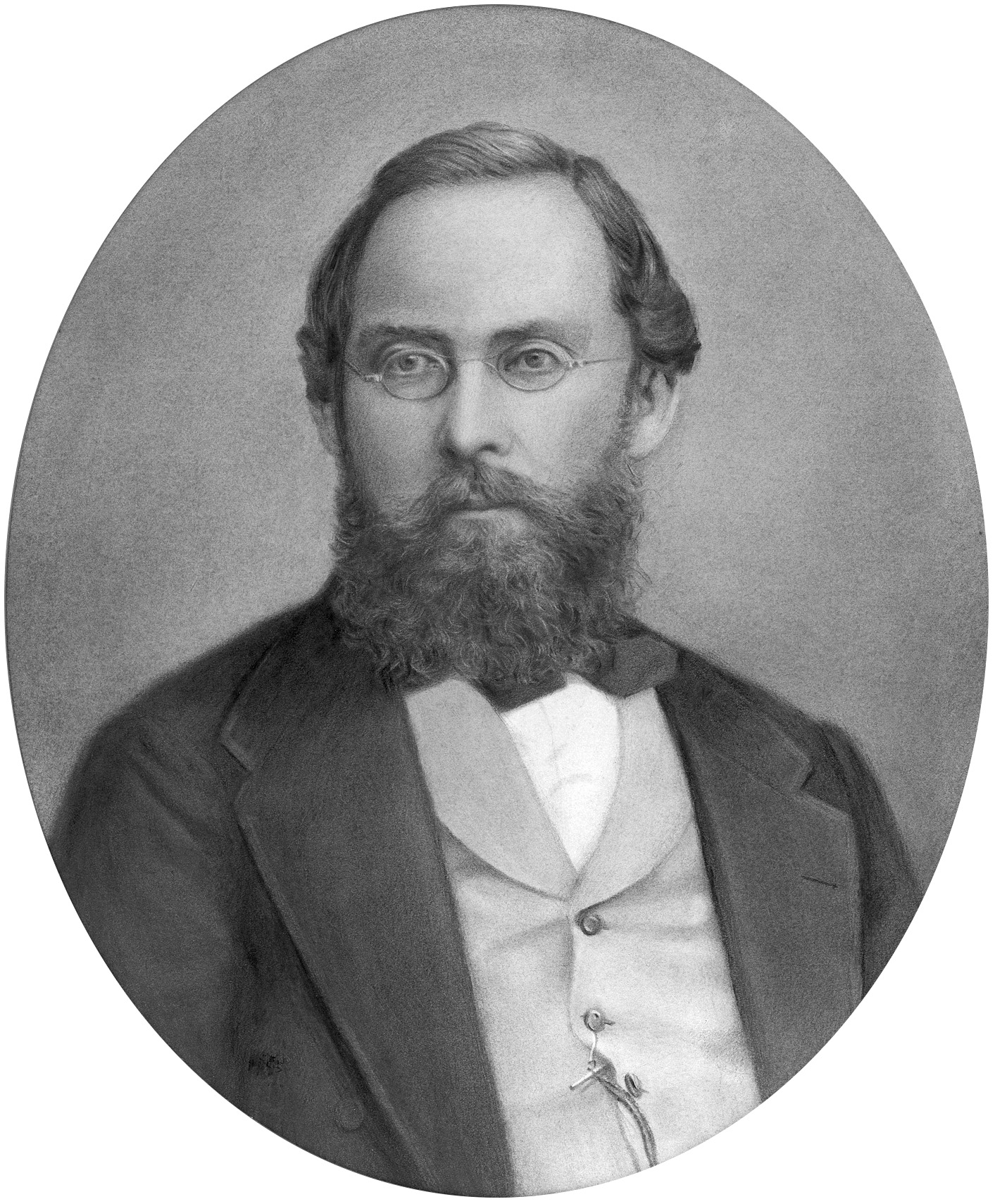
- Born: 18 April 1822; Bleicherode, German Confederation
- Died: 25 September 1878 (aged 56); Gotha, German Empire
- Known for: "No issue without a map"
- Scientific career
- Fields: Cartography

Augustus Heinrich Petermann (18 April 1822 – 25 September 1878) was a German cartographer.

== Early years ==
Petermann was born in Bleicherode, Prussia, Germany. When he was 14 years old, he started grammar school in the nearby town of Nordhausen. Despite family pressures to become a clergyman, he pursued his passion for cartography instead.

Heinrich Berghaus, with the support of Alexander von Humboldt, started the 'Geographische Kunstschule' (Geographical School of Art) in 1839 in Potsdam, close to Berlin, following the example of the school for engravers at the Archives Militaires Generales in Paris (founded in 1811). During its existence, Berghaus's academy offered only three courses, and only a few students attended:

- 1839–1844: August Petermann, Heinrich 'Henry' Lange (1821–1893), and Otto Göcke, who died one year later of tuberculosis.
- 1844–1847: Amandus Sturmhöfel (1823–?) and Theodor Schilling.
- 1845–1850: Hermann Berghaus (1828–1890), his nephew.

Petermann's father, August Rudolf Petermann, who was a registrar at Bleicherode, could not pay for the further education of his son. When he read the advertisement for Berghaus' school he sent his son's maps and other work for evaluation. One of the maps, drawn when he was 16, shows South America, and was later published in the journal which was to carry his name. Berghaus recognized the quality of Petermann's work, and therewith his potential and soon took him in as a foster-son. As Berghaus already had a large family to feed, however, he requested an annual subsidy of 60 thaler from the king to support Petermann, which was granted. During the 3rd course, Berghaus treated his nephew Hermann Berghaus the same way. Only Lange paid for the courses, the rest followed them at Berghaus's own expense.

Petermann started his education in Potsdam on 7 August 1839. The education with Berghaus was scientifically cartographic, consisting of mathematical geography (map projections and grids), physical geography (meteorology, hydrology and geology) and political geography (knowledge of borders and administrative divisions of European states especially). Physical training was aimed at surveying, drafting and engraving. Berghaus's pupils learned only the rudiments of surveying, even less than he himself had learned: their work in this area can be seen in the plan of Potsdam (Neüester Plan von der Königlichen Residenzstadt Potsdam / nach trigonometrischen Vermessungen, so wie geo- und hydrometrischen Aufnahmen ausgearbeitet in der Geographischen Kunstschule zu Potsdam unter der Leitung ihres Direktors, des Professors Dr. Heinrich Berghaus. 1845). They were not topographers and only used topography as published in the large-scale maps of that era as a general basis for their later, more generalized works. They were taught more to draft and engrave medium-scale geographic maps of states, continents etc., or their parts (e.g. the map of upper and middle-Italy in 1847 for Stielers Handatlas, which was based on Attilio Zuccagni-Orlandini's 1844 topographic map in nearly 100 sheets), small-scale generalised school maps, and especially applied geography and cartography as shown in their collaboration on the Physikalischer Atlas and the maritime atlas. During their study lithography, though not cutting as fine a portrayal as copper engraving, was on the rise because it was much cheaper. Though some experiments were made by Berghaus, e.g. for geological maps, by mixing copper engraving for the line- and other features and lithography for coloured polygons, there was no technology that could replace the exquisite expression copper engravings could reach. So the students mainly learned this art. Only at the end of his life did Petermann became more enthusiastic about lithography, which had advanced by then. Up to and including the 10th edition of the Stieler Handatlas (1920–1925) the Perthes Institute, where he worked from 1854 onwards, used copperplate engravings as the basis for its maps. Some 460 copperplates of this edition are currently preserved in the Perthes collections in Gotha.

Berghaus had been riding numerous hobbyhorses (terrain representation, isolines, scale indicators, map projections, etc.) without much success, but now he could finally put them to work with his pupils. He very successfully disseminated many of his ideas and concepts. Moreover, his students somehow learned better than he to limit their endeavors in order to bring more of them to full fruition. Though the school itself had but few students, its residency in Potsdam, connected by rail to Berlin, and the fame of Berghaus attracted many geographers (e.g. Alexander von Humboldt, Carl Ritter and Zeune), cartographers and explorers. Petermann spoke highly of his encounters with von Humboldt and drew several maps for his Atlas von Asien, on which the rendering of the Asiatic mountain chains was of a quality corresponding to the then-current view of the geographic sciences. Because of all these contacts, the students were confronted with many opinions and views on the state of science and the world that would not normally have been part of their curriculum. Besides, we may take Poggendorff seriously when he sees Petermann as 'private secretary and librarian of H.K.W. Berghaus' in the years 1839–45, so we can assume that Petermann was at least quite up to date on many affairs to do with geography and cartography, for Berghaus had large collections of maps, books and notes to draw on.

During and after their training, students were obliged to take part in most of the school's enterprises. In the years 1839–1848, the school produced maps for Stieler's school atlas, and Berghaus's Physikalischer Atlas, school atlases, the Atlas von Asien, the Prussian atlas, and the maritime atlas.

== British experience ==
=== Scotland ===
August Petermann gained commercial insight during his years in the cartography business in Edinburgh and London from 1845 to 1854. Normally he would have been obliged to work in Berghaus' school until 1849, as it was laid down in the contracts the students had to sign. These stated that the students had to work for five years after they finished their studies to pay for their tuition.

In 1842, Alexander Keith Johnston (1804–1871) visited Gotha to discuss several projects with Perthes. These negotiations first resulted in the publication of the National Atlas of General Geography, which contained 4 maps by Berghaus. Though Berghaus deemed the commercial and scientific climate in England not ready for scientific maps Johnston persisted in wanting to publish a translation of the Physikalischer Atlas, on which he requested aid from Berghaus. With a letter of recommendation by von Humboldt in October 1844, Heinrich 'Henry' Lange joined Johnston in Edinburgh for this purpose. Petermann stayed behind in Gotha and became a teacher in the 2nd course of Berghaus' school. In April 1845, he followed Lange, who received him in his house in Edinburgh and acquainted him with the friends he had made. Together they went on a tour through the Grampians, applying what they had learned by using barometers for height measurements and taking geological and botanical samples. Meanwhile, they also worked on Johnston's Physical atlas (Physical geography, illustrating in a series of original designs, the elementary facts of geology, hydrology, meteorology and natural history etc.) and several other cartographic publications.

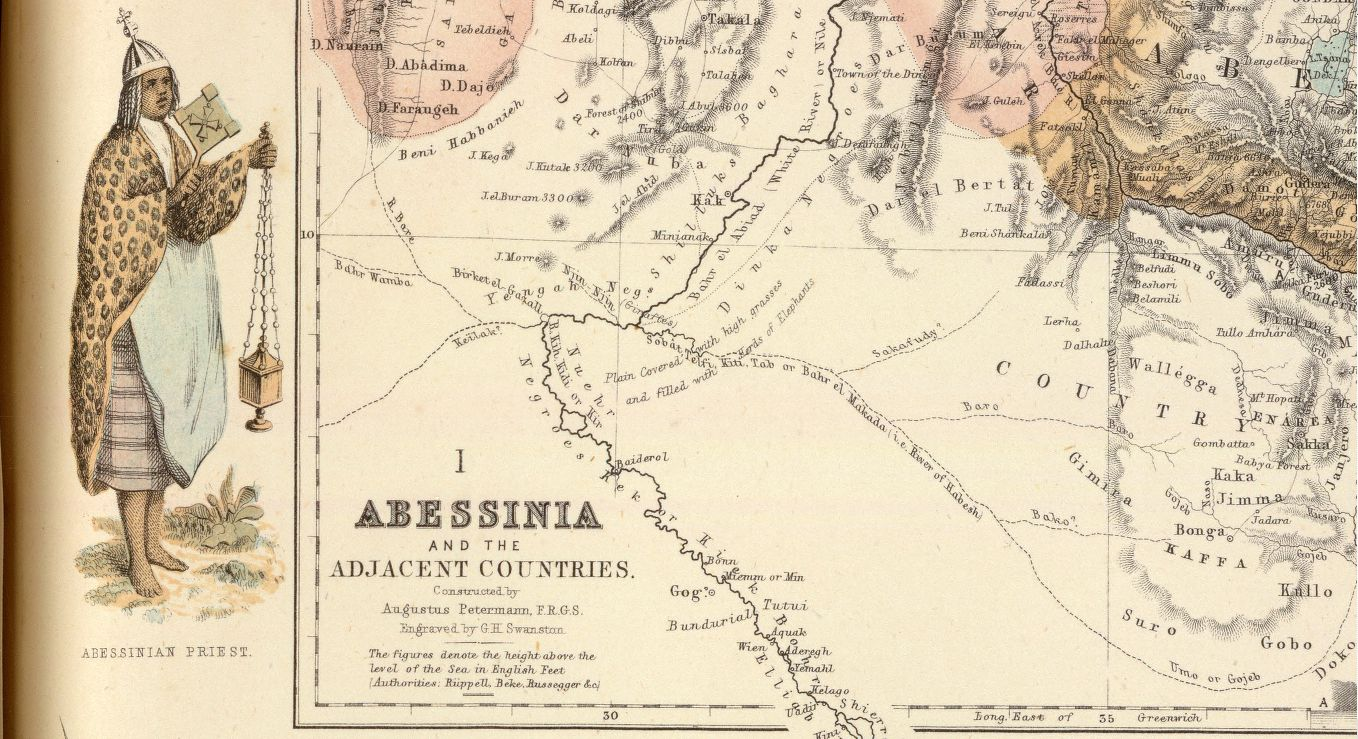
Portion of Petermann's map of Abessinia

During his time in Edinburgh, he may have come into contact with the publisher G.H. Swanston, for whom he constructed several maps for The Royal Illustrated Atlas, Of Modern Geography, 1st edition published in 27 parts 1854–62. and republished probably in 1872. He also may have met John Bartholomew Jr. (1831–1893) in Edinburgh, who created many maps in the same atlas. John Bartholomew became Petermann's student in Gotha in 1855 until he was recalled to his father's firm in 1856. The German school of cartography was pre-eminent, and four generations of Bartholomews widened their knowledge by studying with the German masters. John George's son Ian Bartholomew studied in Leipzig (1907–08) with Oswald Winkel. His grandson John Christopher carried on the tradition, studying with Eduard Imhof, the great Swiss cartographer, in Berne and Zurich in 1960, and his son John Eric followed in 1977 with Imhof's pupil, Ernst Spiess. "Bartholomew is best known for the development of colour contouring (or hypsometric tints), the system of representing altitudes on a graduated colour scale, with areas of high altitude in shades of brown and areas of low altitude in shades of green. He first showcased his colour contouring system at the Paris Exhibition of 1878; although it initially met with skepticism, it went on to become standard cartographical practice". However, he might have picked up this idea during his time in Gotha as the colour scheme was first introduced by Emil von Sydow (1812–1873) in 1838 when he developed a color methodology for landscape features using hachures, where green was depicted for lowlands and brown used for highlands. The white for the higher reaches might later have been used by Hermann Haack (1872–1966) for his Perthes' wall maps. Several maps were co-constructions of Petermann and Bartholomew.

=== London ===
In 1847, Petermann moved to London with the intention of furthering his geographical studies and then returning to Germany. Soon, however, he decided to follow a professional career there as the environment he moved into seemed to be favorable for his prospects. In London, he worked as a reporter for a London periodical (Athenaeum, journal of literature, science and the fine arts. London, 1828–1921), and in 1850 founded his own establishment: The Geographical Establishment, Engraving, Lithographic and Printing Office, 9 Charing Cross. In 1852 the young Ernst Georg Ravenstein (1834–1913) was apprenticed to him before he went in 1855 into the service of the Topographical Department of the British War Office. Petermann's firm published, among other things, the Atlas of physical geography with descriptive letter press (1850, with Thomas Milner), and the Physical statistical maps of the British Isles, showing the geographical distribution of the population and inland hydrography. His productions for the Journal of the Royal Geographical Society included the map Survey of the Sea of Aral by commander A. Butakoff, 1848 & 1849. He also established lifelong relationships with many scientists, politicians and explorers, mainly through his membership of the Royal Geographical Society (RGS) of London. In 1847, he became a member of the RGS. When he was 28 in 1850 he was elected under-Secretary. In 1868 he was awarded with the prestigious 'Founders medal' of the RGS. Queen Victoria, at the suggestion of Robert Bunsen, appointed him 'physical geographer-royal'.

Early in his career, Petermann already wanted to further the cause of geographical exploration as shown by his concern for and interference with James Richardson's expedition. The purpose of this expedition, which was supported by the British government, was to negotiate trade treaties with the rulers of the middle Sudan. Petermann, supported by Carl Ritter and Robert Bunsen, pleaded with the British government to let Heinrich Barth and Adolf Overweg join up with Richardson's expedition to assure that geographical and scientific aspects which they might encounter were taken care of. When still affiliated with the Zeitschrift für Allgemeine Erdkunde, he published their progress in this journal, and when he started Petermanns geographische Mitteilungen he followed this through.

=== Maps and articles published in English media ===
His long stay in Britain made him familiar with the best in British and German geography, and he was fluent in both German and French, which knowing both was a prerequisite to attend Berghaus' school. That helped him to read as widely as necessary for his further career. His love for the exploration of the polar regions probably started in London, for many of the polar explorers, especially after the disappearance of the Franklin expedition, presented their discoveries to the Royal Geographical Society. From 1848 onward he published, among other things, the following articles and maps with English publishers or in English language journals:

- On the Fall of the Jordan, and of the Principal Rivers in the United Kingdom. In: Journal of the Royal Geographical Society of London, Vol. 18, (1848), pp. 89–104, 2 diagrams.
- Geological map of the world showing the distribution of active volcanoes and the regions visited by earthquakes / constructed by Augustus Petermann; engraved by I. Dower, Pentonville, London. London : Published by Orr and Comy., Amen Corner, Paternoster Row, [1849]
- The Atlas Of Physical Geography: Constructed By Augustus Petermann, F.R.G.S. ... With Descriptive Letter-Press, Embracing A General View Of The Physical Phenomena Of The Globe. By The Rev. Thomas Milner, M.A., F.R.G.S. ...
- Mr. Petermann's note, containing tabular summary, &c. In: Journal of the Royal Geographical Society of London, Vol. 20, (1850), pp. 232–235.
- A descriptive atlas of astronomy, and of physical and political geography, by the Rev. Thomas Milner M.A., F.R.G.S. ..., The maps of physical and political geography constructed, or carefully revised and corrected by August Petermann F.R.G.S., London, Wm. S. Orr and co, c. 1850
- Zoological Map Showing the distribution of the principal mammiferous animals (class mammalia) over the globe. London, Orr and Co., c.1850
- Survey of the Province of Tarapaca in the Department of Arequipa Peru commenced in 1827 by Wm. Bollaert and Geo. Smith with additions to 1851 by W.B. In: Journal of the Royal Geographical Society of London, Vol. 21, (1851).
- Progress of the African Mission, Consisting of Messrs. Richardson, Barth, and Overweg, to Central Africa. In: Journal of the Royal Geographical Society of London, Vol. 21, (1851), pp. 130–221, 2 maps.
- Notes on the Distribution of Animals Available as Food in the Arctic Regions. In: Journal of the Royal Geographical Society of London, Vol. 22, (1852), pp. 118–127.
- Sir John Franklin, the Sea of Spitzbergen, and Whale-Fisheries in the Arctic Regions. In: Journal of the Royal Geographical Society of London, Vol. 23, (1853), pp. 129–136, 2 maps.
- Map of part of northern Africa showing the routes of the expedition under Messrs. Richardson, Barth, Overweg & Vogel in the years 1850 and 1853. London, E. Stanford, 1854.
- Australia and New Zealand according to Arrowsmith and Mitchell. Edinburgh; London; Dublin : A. Fullarton & Co., [1858?]. (several editions).
- The Grecian Archipelago according to the English Admiralty Survey 1828–1849, drawn by Augustus Petermann, engraved by G.H.Swanston, published by Fullerton circa 1860.
- Australia and New Zealand. Edinburgh; London : A. Fullarton & Co., [1872].
- Peru-Bolivian Tablelands; Chiefly according to Pentland, Parish, Fitzroy Meyen, Arrowsmith &c. &c. Constructed by Augustus Petermann, F.R.G.S. Engraved by G.H. Swanston. Maps 2–4: Chile according to Admiralty Surveys, United States Expn. by J. Bartholomew Junr. F.R.G.S.
- Journey of M. Gerhard Rohlfs Through Marocco and Tuat, 1863–64. In: Proceedings of the Royal Geographical Society of London, Vol. 9, No. 2 (1864–1865), pp. 79–80
- On the Proposed Expedition to the North Pole. In: Proceedings of the Royal Geographical Society of London, Vol. 9, No. 3 (1864–1865), pp. 90–104.
- Second Letter to Sir Roderick I. Murchison, on the Subject of North Polar Exploration. In: Proceedings of the Royal Geographical Society of London, Vol. 9, No. 4 (1864–1865), pp. 114–125.
- The Northern and Central states of Germany, drawn by Augustus Petermann, F.R.G.S., engraved by J. Bartholomew, published by A. Fullarton & Co, London & Edinburgh, c. 1870.
- On the Exploration of the North Polar Region. In: Proceedings of the Royal Geographical Society of London, Vol. 12, No. 2 (1867–1868), pp. 92–113.
- British Guayana / according to Sir Robert Schomburgk drawn by Augustus Petermann F.R.G.S. Engraved by G.H. Swanston. A. Fullarton & Co. London, Edinburgh & Dublin, 1872.
- Caucausus & Crimea with the Northern Portions of the Black & Caspian Seas, IX. (with) Crimea according to Huot & Demidoff. Drawn & Engraved by J. Bartholomew, Edinburgh. (with) The Caucasus according to Profr. Dr. Karl Koch, with additions from other Sources by Augustus Petermann, F.R.G.S. Engraved by G.H. Swanston. A. Fullarton & Co. London, Edinburgh & Dublin. 1872.
- Danish Islands in the North Atlantic Ocean. XII. (with) Iceland according to the Trigon Survey of Gunnlaugsson drawn by Augustus Petermann F.R.G.S. Engraved by G.H. Swanston. 1872.
- Exploration of the Arctic Regions. In: Proceedings of the Royal Geographical Society of London, Vol. 19, No. 2 (1874–1875), pp. 173–180
- "Important Points in Central African Explorations". In: Journal of the American Geographical Society of New York, Vol. 7, (1875), pp. 324–328.
- Germany = Deutschland / Constructed by Augustus Petermann; Peter & Galpin; engraved by I. Dower. London, Ward & Lock. 1880.

It is no surprise to see that his sphere of interest in 'current' geography, was only sharpened when paired with his updating of Stieler's Hand-Atlas. In stressing the geographic nature of cartography, he showed himself more a Humboldtian than a follower of Ritter's political-historical school. M. Linke et al. wrote in 1986: "There seems to be no doubt that Petermann’s work contributed to the high standards of British cartography during these years". T.W. Freeman has noted that "Fine maps had been produced in the 1851 Census by August Heinrich Petermann during his long stay in Britain (1845–54) with the Johnston map firm in Edinburgh and later in London, but since his departure, the standard has declined ". In 1852 and 1853, Petermann published some maps on cholera in Britain, explaining that the map, better than tables, can show the progress and victim density of the disease, following the example set by Heinrich Berghaus in his Physikalischer Atlas, Band II, Abt. VIII, no. 2 (1847). These were later followed by Keith Johnston in the second edition of The physical atlas of natural phenomena (1856).

Maps in the Journal (Proceedings) of the Royal Geographical Society can be viewed through JSTOR.

== Petermanns geographische Mitteilungen (PGM) ==
See footnote

=== Start-up of the journal ===
"From the early 1850s, Petermann maintained private and business contacts with the two Gotha publishers Wilhelm and Bernhardt Perthes, and in June 1853 he actually spent a short time in Gotha.". Financial difficulties and several other factors prompted him to accept the Perthes' offer of work in 1854. Early in his German career here Petermann was appointed first professor (1854) and later honorary doctor (1855) of the University of Göttingen by the Duke of Gotha. Bernhardt Perthes hired him with the prospect of playing an important role in the establishment of his geographical institute. At the same time, his friend Henry Lange also started to work with Perthes. When he was refused a position equal to Petermann he left Perthes and started to work for Brockhaus in Leipzig. When Petermann went to the Gotha Institute part of the original plan was that he would revive the Geographisches Jahrbuch (Geographical Yearbook), which Heinrich Berghaus had edited from 1850 to 1852. At the suggestion of the manager Adolf Müller (1820–1880) it was decided instead to publish the monthly Mittheilungen aus Justus Perthes Geographischer Anstalt über wichtige neue Erforschungen auf dem Gesamtgebiet der Geographie von Dr. A. Petermann (PGM) (Communications from the Justus Perthes Geographical Institute concerning important new studies in the whole field of geography, by Dr. A. Petermann). These were to be published in 'casual issues'. Their relation to several of the Perthes atlases was plainly expounded in the preface to the first issue of 1855:

"Our 'Communications' will differ from all similar publications in that they will summarise and graphically illustrate the results of new geographic explorations in precisely executed and carefully detailed maps. Every issue of our periodical will therefore include one or more map supplements, and their design will guarantee a continuous and easily accessible supplement in easy-to-manage form with special regard for those who own Stielers Hand-Atlas, Berghaus's Physical Atlas, and other map publications of the (Perthes) Institute. We will take special care to always present our readers with important new discoveries immediately or as fast as possible."

In the same preface he put the main focus of the 'Mittheilungen' on physical and bio-geography, geology and other natural phenomena, and to a lesser degree on ethnography. Its greatest strength lay in the accompanying maps, for it was thought these would show best the results of geographic exploration. In an age hungry for adventure, but not yet totally scientifically literate, this was the best way to attract the largest possible group of interested readers. The maps not only supplemented several of the Perthes atlases, but were also used as a forum to elaborate on new themes, thus widening the thematic scope of cartography. He expresses his emphasis on maps anew when he writes in the Geographisches Jahrbuch:

"In first instance the end result and final goal of all geographic investigations, explorations, and surveys is the depiction of the earth’s surface: the map. The map is the basis for geography. The map shows us what we know about our earth in the best, clearest and most exact way. The contemporary map should so depict the earth’s surface that one can not only measure the horizontal positions of and distances between all points and localities, but also clearly distinguish vertical variations, from sea level to the highest summits."

Petermann was responsible for drawing most of the maps in the first few years of the journal. His strength was in the analysis and evaluation of all sources available. As such one can say that the indication 'Originalkarte' (original map) in many titles was well earned, for few slavishly copied what explorers or other experts had sketched. German geographers, like Hermann Wagner (1840–1929), claimed that in other geographical journals explorer's maps were just copied instead of having them evaluated by cartographers first. Maps based on recent exploration reports were always, when possible, complemented with route maps from previous expeditions. He did not like to infer or extrapolate from the sources, for that might give inaccurate measurements, so many of his maps show large blank spaces. How right he was in this respect was demonstrated in 1911 when Julien Thoulet drafted bathymetric maps for the territory of France. In these four maps he draws hypothetical isobaths, which are based on respectively 15, 31, 154, and 308 altitude measurements per 153,821 square miles (398,390 km^{2}) for France and the adjacent territories. (A reasonable number of measuring points for precipitation and temperature maps would be 1,500 and 600 per 100,000 km^{2} respectively to create acceptable isoline maps for these phenomena). These give schematic negative relief maps, which hardly even approximate the true relief of the territory. Thoulet wanted to show that the few bathymetric measurements available for the vast oceans would only vaguely approximate the true relief of the ocean floors. Petermann must have had the same idea intuitively for his exploratory maps. He was keen, however, to introduce spot heights and spot depths in the maps he drafted so that others could benefit from them.

=== Technical innovations ===
Having understood well from his teacher, Heinrich Berghaus, the merit of the metric scale he introduced the representative fraction as map scale, without discarding, however, the verbal better known or local scale. The popular acceptance of the metric system and Greenwich as prime meridian was slower in the uptake. Only with the ninth edition of Stieler's Hand-Atlas (1900–1905) was this process completed.

In 1870, Petermann advocated the use of a red and blue color scheme for temperature maps of the oceans. Although the number of projection methods increased at a reasonable rate, a few well-known sorts, like the stereographic and orthographic equatorial projections and the projections of Lambert, Flamsteed and Mercator, remained the most popular. Petermann did publish reports on the new projection methods of J. Babinet (1854) and J. James (1857), and G. Jäger, but he hardly used them. Though Petermann and Ernst Behm (1830–1884; like many of the famous Gothaer geographers and cartographers Behm had first another profession. He was a physician, who learned the geographic trade in practice) wrote many articles about geodesy and surveying, they rarely got involved in other technical and theoretical cartographic issues. Petermann concerned himself much more with printing technology, especially colour-lithography. Although they produced many color maps in this way in the 1870s, more and more maps returned to hand coloring, for it then became cheaper than lithography. According to Stams, the Gotha Institute may have produced some 2,500,000 hand-colored maps for all its cartographic products in a decade, or 800 per day! In his last article published before his death, Petermann speaks enthusiastically about the newly developed photogravure, which considerably reduced costs per map while also increasing production speed. In his opinion the 715-sheet Austrian map was probably twenty times more efficiently produced than an engraved version would have been, for its production took only a fifth of the time and a fourth of the costs. In 1857 the President of the Royal Geographical Society, Sir Roderick Murchison, praised PGM for its fast reporting of diverse explorations, and spoke against the jealousy of those in his own Society who felt that exploration supported primarily by the British should first be published in Britain: he thought the Perthes Institute enriched the scientific geographic discourse.

=== 'Petermann school' also known as 'Gotha school' ===
Since he was not appointed head of the Perthes establishment Petermann could only guide the other skills available. Fortunately he could call on cartographers and engravers who had developed their skills through long experience with men like Adolf Stieler, Stülpnagel, Heinrich Berghaus, Emil von Sydow, etc., as well as new cartographers like Carl Vogel and Hermann Berghaus. According to Hermann Wagner it was not felt wise to have any of these employees appointed as head of the establishment. Instead the firm was led by Adolf Müller, not a cartographer, but an economic manager.

The cartographers Petermann trained included Bruno Hassenstein (1839–1902), Hermann Habenicht (1844–1917, who from 1897 onwards trained Hermann Haack, the 20th-century editor of PGM), Ernst Debes (1840–1923). He could have come to rival Carl Vogel, but in 1868 he left the Gotha Institute to co-found his own firm, [Heinrich] Wagner & Debes, which published one of the six famous families of German reference atlases E. Debes neuer Handatlas, later called Grosser Columbus Weltatlas), Carl Barich, Arnim Welcker (1840–1859), Ludwig Friederichsen (who worked on the Stieler and PGM from 1859 to 1863, and later founded the geographical society of Hamburg and became very active in German colonial politics.) in the 1850s, and Fritz Hanemann (1847–1877), Christian Peip (1843–1922), Bruno Domann and Otto Koffmahn (1851–1916) in the 1860s. They soon learned to produce maps as good as their teacher's, and eventually even better. But they had probably listened well when Petermann pointed out the need for an improvement in map lettering, in elevation figures (though elevation and bathymetric figures were common in topographic maps and charts, Petermann was the first to include them in geographic maps), more accurate engraving and better coloring, for under his directions the maps of the Stieler became more uniform in expression. In this they were also guided by the more than consistent work of Vogel, and Von Sydow's critical remarks concerning the advantages and disadvantages of certain styles in his Kartographischen Standpunkt Europas.

Petermann was also keen to use physical characteristics as background for thematic maps, an idea followed by his pupils. When Herbert Louis demanded in 1960 that the terrain underlying thematic maps should indicate elevations, hydrological networks, settlements and traffic roads, he cited Petermann as the first cartographer who used a terrain map as basis for population maps. By using hachuring as a basis for his Karte des Österreichischen Kaiserstaates zur Übersicht der Dichtigkeit der Bevölkerung nach dem Census von 1857 (Map of the Austrian imperial state as an overview of the population density after the 1857 census, 1860) and the map Die Ausdehnung der Slaven in der Türkei und den angrenzenden Gebieten (Expansion of the Slavic populations in Turkey and adjacent territories, 1869) Petermann continued the representation of geological, climatological and ethnographical data that his teacher Heinrich Berghaus had begun two decades before.

=== Sections ===
From the start, the journal contained small messages concerning developments in geography under the heading Geographische Notizen/Monatsbericht (1855–....). Some of these were concerned with recently published literature, mainly book citations. In 1860 Petermann decided that these should be listed in a more structured way, the latter temporarily as Geographischer Literatur Bericht für ****(1886–1909), maybe inspired by Kroner's literature lists in the Zeitschrift für allgemeine Erdkunde of the 'Gesellschaft für Erdkunde'. Books and maps would not merely be listed, but also reviewed, if they were part of the Perthes library. Unlike most listings it would also cover articles from the main journals, for these, he noted, were the primary sources reflecting the most recent developments in geography. This would keep the readers of PGM up to date. Other sections of the journal were: Geographische Nekrologie des Jahres **** (1858–1884), Geographie und Erforschung Polar-Regionen (nr. 51/1871-nr. 135/1878), Monatsbericht über Entdeckungsgeschichte und Kolonisation (1885), Kleinere Mitteilungen (1889–1939), Geographischer Anzeiger (1899–1902), Kartographischer Monatsbericht aus Justus Perthes' Geographischer Anstalt in Gotha (1908–1911), Militärkartographie (1909–1914), Staaten und Völker (1923), Neue Forschung im Felde (1935–1939), (Wehr- und) Militärgeographie (1935–1936), Kartographie (1941–1945).

== Mapping the unknown ==
Though Petermanns name appears on hundreds of maps, Wagner suggests he stopped drafting maps himself after 1862. The report concerning the Nordenskiöld voyage to the Lena River, and the maps of the United States and Australia, suggest this may not be true. Perhaps he no longer designed, constructed and drafted the maps, as he had with the Barth maps, but he most likely continued to play a role in the conception and design of the maps, especially those in his fields of interest.

Petermann was very well aware that even topographic maps were not yet a true representation of reality (this is illustrated by the depiction of the Liparian Isles, which were not securely situated until Darondeau's French survey in 1858), let alone medium- and small-scale maps of the interior of continents and the polar regions. One could still hardly speak of dense topographic, orographic and hydrological information. Though the maps in the Stieler looked dense with information, they were mainly filled out with information where space in the image allowed, and the cartographers had little choice what to depict by the lack of known phenomena. The density of information did not indicate how thoroughly an area had been explored, for the cartographers selected their data and drafted the maps in such a way as to give a balanced image as possible. As Petermann put it in 1866:

"In fact, our cartographic knowledge of the territories of the earth is far less than is generally supposed. ... [In the maps,] even the African and Australian terrae incognitae shrink more and more, and there remain [only] a few blank spots, maybe 'wild territories', where there is 'nothing'. In reality everything we see on our maps is just the first step, the beginning of a more accurate knowledge of the earth’s surface."

Only in the detailed maps in PGM, where many spaces were left blank, could one really judge how haphazard and incomplete the geographic knowledge was. J.G. Bartholomew in 1902 phrased Petermann's drive as: "The filling up of the blank spaces of the unknown in his maps had such a fascination for him that rest seemed impossible to him while any country remained unexplored".

The results of the exploratory expeditions cried out for presentation in map form, and PGM published exploration results as quickly and accurately as possible. Petermann had all results he received from explorers checked against the considerable information and maps available in the Perthes Institute. This fund of knowledge grew to be so large that the Institute soon had a large library of manuscripts, books, atlases, and maps at its disposal that could vie with any university or society collection. In the 1980s it was thought that the Perthes-archives contained 180,000 printed maps and around 2,800 atlases. In the 1990s the estimate was 1,000 m of archive, some 400,000 maps (including manuscripts), and some 120,000 geographical works. All collections (currently estimated at 185,000 sheets of maps, 120,000 geographical works, and 800 m of archives) were acquired in 2003 by the Free State of Thüringen and deposited with the library of the University of Erfurt in its research center in Gotha.

But the maps went beyond a simple presentation of the itinerary by also describing the area explored with all knowledge available and pointing out gaps that remained to be filled in the current knowledge. So the impact was reciprocal. Moreover, Petermann gave directions to explorers in exchange for which he was allowed to publish their results as soon as possible.

=== Richardson's African expedition ===
The influence Petermann tried to wield, even as a young man, can best be illustrated by his interference, together with Bunsen and Ritter, on behalf of Heinrich Barth, who wished to take part in the Richardson expedition. He later also persuaded the English government to send Eduard Vogel after them for scientific research and astronomical observations. Petermann published the results under the title Account of the expedition to Central-Africa. When first Barth and later Vogel failed to return at the expected time Germany frantically tried to discover their fate, much as Britain had with Franklin in the Arctic area. This led to many new German expeditions to Africa (by Theodor von Heuglin, Hermann Steudner, Theodor Kinzelbach, Karl Moritz von Beurmann, Gerhard Rohlfs, Karl Mauch and others), most financed by gifts due largely to Petermann's agitating actions and publications. Many found their death in Africa as shown in the map with the subtitle Four martyrs of German science in Inner-Africa shows, i.c. Overweg, Vogel, Beurmann and Steudner.

Petermann first drafted maps of Barth & Overweg's routes for the journal of the German Geographical Society and followed these up with maps in PGM in 1855, 1857, and 1859. These were later worked into the maps for Barth's voluminous work on his African voyage of 1850–55. The route maps were used in new maps up to 1893. When we compare the maps in Barth's work and in PGM we may get an idea of how the information was turned into images. The first map in Barth's work gives an overview of his routes. The routes of Livingstone have already been engraved, but have not been highlighted by coloring. The 1857 issue of PGM uses the same copperplate, but with both routes highlighted and another title. Sheets 2–14 of Barth's work are route maps on the scale 1:800,000 and 1:1,000,000. In 1855 PGM gives only a summary of the routes of the first half of the total tour, on scale of 1:2,100,000, with added profiles along the borders that do not appear on the detail maps. This was a corrected issue of a map first published in London. In the 1857 issue the map of Touareg-country is a copy, but mainly uncolored. Maps 15 and 16 of Barth's work form a beautifully drafted and colored two-sheet map at a scale of 1:6,000,000 and measures 57 x 85 cm. It depicts the approximate territories of the indigenous tribes. The other maps in the 1857 issue show rather small details of the routes, not beautifully executed, while in the text a plan of Agades is inserted (I do not know if it exists in Barth's work). All in all, there is little overlap, also because the scales used for the different works are mostly different. But the smaller maps are clearly generalizations of the maps in Barth's work. The images in Barth's look sharper, but of course that is also because they are engraved on a larger scale, while all the areas outside the routes, of which nothing or not enough is known are blank. These routes, like many others, were reused in many new maps, such as Barth's route, supplemented with the 1828 routes of René-Auguste Caillé (1799–1838) and Léopold Planet (1850).

=== Invitation for exploring Africa ===
PGM not only reported the findings of explorers but also was proactive in instigating new explorations. Ergänzungsband II of 1863 contains a 10-part map (210x102 cm) of Africa (Karte von Inner-Afrika, that contained all routes of explorers between 1701 and 1863. The most important parts of the map are the blank areas, hoping that they would stimulate explorers to go on expeditions to find out what new things there could be. But it was also a case of marketing PGM, as shown in the memoire that accompanied the map, where Petermann wrote:

"The basic idea of our map was to give travellers a sure support for the choice of their routes and guarantee the direction of the explorations, to resolve doubts and stimulate the elucidation of the unknown, and to offer a means for friends at home to follow their moves and to judge the value of their labour. This by creating a cartographic representation of the least known central regions of Africa utilizing all material at hand as completely as possible, to display the range of our contemporary knowledge as well as the way this knowledge is acquired and the degree of its reliability."

=== Arctic explorations ===
Petermann spent a lot of time on the active promotion of his exploratory missions, especially the polar regions. For this he wrote more articles than for any of his other ventures. Up to 1871 he published seventeen maps of the Arctic and Antarctic in the regular issues and eight in the 'supplement' issues. He began publishing notices on the geography and exploration of the polar regions in PGM 38, 1871 (Geographie und Erforschung der Polar-Regionen started in 1865 and nos. 51–135 appeared in PGM volumes 16, 1871 to 23, 1878), and from that time onwards 195 maps covered the polar regions, but none appeared in the supplements of that period. He actually started to push his interest in this subject in the 1865 issue of PGM and with the publication of supplement 16 (Ergänzungsband IV) in 1865. In the PGM-issue he recites the correspondence he has with the Royal Geographical Society (RGS) concerning the proposal of capt. Sherard Osborn (1822–1875) to send another English expedition to the North pole starting from Baffin Bay. In several articles he tries to persuade the RGS to support his plan to start the expedition from Spitsbergen and use steamships instead of sledges for transport. In one article he stresses his love for Arctic expeditions by reminiscing: "Who, like us, e.g. has attended the accounts of one capt. Inglefield (Edward Augustus Inglefield (1820–1894)) during the session of the Royal Geographical Society of London on 22 November 1852, would be persuaded to know that the natural beauty of the Arctic regions cannot be surpassed by any other in the world." Though the accompanying map shows his theory concerning an extended Greenland he doesn't write about this, but mainly about his errouneous theory concerning the behavior of the Gulf Stream. Supplement IV gives an overview of the knowledge of the area around Spitsbergen and the central Arctic. It contains articles by Petermann, R. Werner, N. Dunér and A.E. Nordenskiöld, Dr. Malmgrén, Barto von Löwenigh, and G. Jäger, and is accompanied by three maps. Petermann published this supplement issue to encourage people and institutes to support German efforts to explore the central Arctic. The first map, scale 1:40,000,000 covers both the Arctic and Antarctica, with the routes of the explorers from Cook to 1861. He measures the unexplored area in the Arctic as 140,000 German square miles (approximately 7,700,000 km^{2}), comparing it to Australia's total of 138,000. The unexplored Antarctic he calculates as 396,000 German square miles (approximately 21,800,000 km^{2}). Petermann uses the map specifically to show the benefits of using ships for exploration, rather than the sledges usually used by the Americans and the British. He must have been convinced that the central Arctic contained vast expanses of open water and land, the latter presumably extensions of Greenland and Spitsbergen. Though the routes in the Antarctic map have been engraved, they are not highlighted in color. Instead Petermann has colored the polygons that encompass the areas covered by the several explorers. This highlights the unexplored area clearly, even though it is blank. But Petermann is definitely more interested in having the Germans explore the Arctic than the Antarctic, presumably because the costs of an Arctic expedition can be met more easily than those of an Antarctic one. The more detailed map of Spitsbergen not only shows the Swedish surveys of 1861 to 1864, but also the presence of coal fields, coastal areas with driftwood, and areas where reindeer can normally be found. Petermann's last map is in the modified polar projection first proposed by G. Jäger of Vienna. Jäger had developed this projection specifically to facilitate the palaeontological analysis of the inventory of animal life in the Arctic area. Petermann thought this the best projection for planning the laying of telegraph lines.

==== North-East passage ====
He not only promoted explorations, but also actively collected funds to realize them, and gave an account of the receipts and expenditures in several issues of PGM. In 1865, Otto Volger of the FDH (Freies Deutsches Hochstift für Wissenschaft, Künste und allgemeine Bildung, founded in 1859) organised the 'Allgemeine Deutsche Versammlung von Freunden der Erdkunde' (General German Assembly of Friends of Geography). During this two-day meeting Georg von Neumayer stressed the fact that Germany needed a German maritime institute to be independent of other nations. One of the programmed issues to be discussed was the issue of guidelines for the use of a homogeneous meteorological logbook for the German merchant navy. In later years the maps in PGM made much use of the data thus gathered. Petermann jealously reported on the marine surveys in Britain and America, which were realized with governmental support, and he dearly wished such was possible in other nations, especially Germany. Furthermore, he pointed out that Germany had much to gain by exploring the Arctic region, especially the Northeast Passage, since the English and Americans were concentrating on the Northwest Passage. Though he even tried to get Bismarck involved in an Arctic exploration project, it was shelved for some time because of the Austro-Prussian War and the consequent expansion of the Prussian realm. In PGM that same year, he again turned to the FDH for support. In 1868 Petermann roused so much support for his idea in the German public that his Arctic expedition actually took place.

He proposed to follow a course east of Greenland, for he and other geographers were convinced that Greenland stretched much farther North than was known in that time. Though Ferdinand von Wrangel started a four-year-long expedition in 1820 to find possible land north of Cape Shelagskiy and could not find any land, he noted a Chukchi chief saying: "One might in a clear summer's day descry snow-covered mountains at a great distance to the north." Heinrich Berghaus, Petermann's teacher, included this information in the right hand corner on his isotherm map of 1838 for his Physikalische Atlas with the text 'possible polar land' [Wahrscheinliches Polar-Land]. So it might be that Petermann based his views on this information.

He published the same map of the Arctic and Antarctic as in 1865, but now with Greenland stretching over the Arctic and ending in Wrangel Island close to the Bering Strait. It shows the possible route of the German expedition. The Antarctic map now uses only two colors to delimit the areas covered by James Cook and others. Later in that volume he published two maps of the route sailed by the German expedition. Unfortunately, they discovered a finger of permanent pack ice stretching from the north to approximately 76°, which made progress further north impossible. Petermann was undaunted in his endeavors to reach the North Pole and demonstrate a possible passage to the Pacific Ocean, even after this expedition had failed in that respect. In 1869 he published a map of the Arctic Ocean north of Wrangel Island with all exploration routes between 1648 and 1867 and a map with sea-temperatures in the Greenland Sea and the Norwegian Sea as observed by the German expedition, and again two maps of the German expedition in Ergänzungsheft 28.

In 1874 he again published an overview map of the Arctic at a scale of 1:16,000,000, this time with exploration routes from 1616 to the end of 1874, complemented by the new meteorological weather stations. Strangely enough, the route of the 1868 German expedition is not engraved in the image. Petermann still believed however, that Greenland stretched far into the Polar region. The text in the map reads: 'Unerforscht, wahrscheinlich Land oder Inseln (Petermann's Hypothese)' [unexplored, probably land or islands (Petermann's hypothesis)].

In the case of the polar regions, Petermann's point of view deviated from most contemporary views. While many, especially the Americans and British, saw a possible passage in the Northwest, where they expected to find a passage after rounding Greenland, Petermann thought this not a viable option. But this did not prevent him from publishing many reports and maps of the American and British explorations in this area, sometimes translated from the journal of the Royal Geographical Society and other geographical societies. Though he was right in hypothesizing that the warm Gulf Stream complemented the cold Labrador Stream and that the warm stream extended far north of Spitsbergen and Nova Zembla, his thesis that it warmed the Arctic needed serious revision. Although he thought it to be a deep stream, he overestimated the effect of the warmth from that depth on surface ice east of Svalbard. On the other hand, he was wrong about the extension of Greenland. He wrote:

"... but such an enormous glacier like the one named after Von Humboldt points at extensive eternal snow and glacier regions and this speaks for an extension of Greenland to the North ..."

His view may have been reinforced by some explorers who sighted land at higher latitudes than the tip of Greenland. While Petermann was honored in 1876 by the American Geographical Society, during the last of 3 weeks visiting the US, Dr. Isaac I. Hayes disputed the hypothesis of Petermann's land tongue stretching from Greenland to the Bering Sea, though he agreed that the Arctic Ocean would possibly have open water.

The Northwest Passage indeed proved to be challenging. Only in 1904 did Roald Amundsen achieve its navigation. As to the Northeast Passage, Nordenskiöld's trip to the Yenisei river in 1875 hinted at this being the easier route. The successful completion of the passage during Nordenskiöld's expedition with the steamship Vega was published in 1879 in PGM shortly after Petermann's death. The map was drafted on top of Petermann's 1873 map of Siberia. The route of the Vega had also appeared on a Russian copy of Petermann's 1873 map. The PGM editors also added it in their 1879 map. This might have been a way to honour Petermann. The map shows clearly to what degree the descriptive data of older explorations (i.e. Vasili Pronchishchev, 1735–36; Hariton Laptev, 1739–43; Semyon Čeluskin, 1735–43; Fyodor Minin and Dmitriy Sterlegov, 1740; and Alexander Theodor von Middendorff, 1843) could be trusted when drafting a map from many sources and trying to amalgamate them into a single image. The difference between the coastlines on the two maps sometimes can be as much as ½° latitude and 1° longitude. Looking at the Taimyr peninsula, the channel between it and the mainland is reduced from approximately 10 km to a few kilometres by the Swedish exploration. The only exception was the information derived from P.F. Anjou (1823), which was based on astronomical observations, and is the same in both maps. The article (translations from Swedish and Danish with a preamble by Behm) and map appeared four months after the Vega had arrived in Irkutsk. Hassenstein drafted the new map, maybe using the older draft. The title was hammered out of the old copperplate and replaced by a new one, while Nordenskiöld's data were engraved, and printed in red, making it look like an overlay on the old map. Because of the use of lighter background colors the newer map looks much fresher than the older one, though only six years lay between the two.

=== Australia ===
Petermann kept his promise, made in the preface of the first issue of PGM, when he was responsible for the new edition of Stieler's Hand-Atlas. He also had a weakness for Australia. Up to his death he published some 48 maps concerning exploration in (parts of) Australia, though hardly any of the expeditions bore any German influence. In 1866, when he gave an account of the first issue of the fifth edition (1866–67) of the Stieler, he frequently referred to maps or articles published in PGM. Furthermore, he mentions that he is working on four other maps of Australia or parts of it. One of these is his famous eight-sheet map of Australia, scale 1:3,500,000, and the other three are concerned with exploration or based on land-property maps. (Spezialkarte von Neu-Süd-Wales nach den Kataster-Aufnahmen, later published as Spezialkarte eines Theiles von New South Wales (PGM, 12, 1866, table 13); Spezialkarte vom See’ngebiet im Inneren von Australien, later published as Das See’n-Gebiet (Lake District) und die Steinige Wüste (Great Stony Desert) im Innern von Australien (PGM, 13, 1867, table 4); Karte der Entdeckungen im Inneren Australiens, scale 1:2,500,000, which he probably chose not to publish in PGM due to all the new discoveries). In 1871/72 he published the eight-sheet map as Specialkarte von Australien in 8 Blättern in Ergänzungsheft 29 (volume VI) and 30 (volume VII). It is a superb effort to compile all available knowledge in a colored map-image that measures 194x118 cm altogether, and it reminds us of the ten-sheet map of Africa of 1863. Being Petermann he would have liked to have accompanied it with a volume containing its ten-year history of exploration and discoveries, but in order not to raise the retail price of the map he satisfied himself with merely citing the volumes of PGM where the information could be found and providing an accompanying 43-page geographical-statistical compendium by C.E. Meinicke. In 1875 a second revised edition appeared, with a small sample in PGM. We unfortunately do not find his famous six-sheet map of the United States (Neue Karte der Vereinigten Staaten vor Nord-Amerika in 6 Blättern) in the issues of PGM. It was produced for the sixth edition of the Stieler on scale 1:3,700.000, though a small part appeared in the next annual as an illustration of the exploration of Northwest Texas.

=== Source interpretations ===
Several times Petermann indicated that he disagreed with the reports of explorers, probably basing his arguments on reports and literature at his disposal or on sound geographic reasoning. In a map, concerning among other things lake Uniamesi, he tends to disagree with Jakob Erhardt, one of the missionaries of the Church Mission Society of London, concerning its situation and extension. Erhardt was erroneous in that he situated the lower tip of the lake around 13° South 36° East and made it bend westward to 28° East, with a probable extension to 24° East. Furthermore, he thought that Lake Victoria, Lake Tanganyika and Lake Nyassa were one inland sea extending to 6° North. A lack of data led Petermann to agree with his erroneous shape of the lake or lakes, but he was not convinced of its wide extension to the west and north. As for the sources of the Nile he was not so much mistaken, as they were indicated by a text near the equator between 30° and 36° East, but this was not so hard to induce. When one views the ethnographic and trade information in the map and interprets them from a relative topological point of view we can see this as the strength of the missionaries' reports. As their mission was focused on people and not on the natural environment this kind of information was of great importance to them. But geometrically their information could not be trusted, in part because most of their information was based on verbal reports of the native tribes.

At other times he depicted maps of the same area from several authors together in one supplement map to show the authors' different interpretations. This was the case with, for example, the map of the Kerguelen and McDonald Islands sighted by John Heard (1853), William MacDonald (1854), Hutton (1854), Attway (1854), Rees (1854), and Neumayer (1857), with several comparisons of explorations since James Cook. The same with small maps (scale ca. 1:33,000,000) of the central part of southern Africa, which shows different interpretations by Heinrich Kiepert (1855), J. McQueen (1857) and David Livingstone (1857). Or with the representation of the Gabon countries, which show interpretations by August Petermann, Thomas E. Bowdich, William D. Cooley, Heinrich Kiepert, Paul Belloni du Chaillu and Heinrich Barth.

Many times he included an outline map of Germany, or parts thereof or other countries to show the vastness through which the explorers had to travel. This must have contributed to the understanding and compassion the readers felt for the sacrifice and hardships the explorers had to go through to come to the results presented in the articles and maps.

== Stieler-Handatlas ==
Since the first edition Friedrich von Stülpnagel had been mainly responsible for the drafting of the maps of Stieler-Handatlas. When Stülpnagel died in 1865 Petermann became responsible for the Stieler. He drafted some maps (e.g. Russland und Skandinavien, Süd-Polar Karte, Neu-Seeland, Australien, Süd-Ost Australien ) for the 4th edition (1863–1867), which reached 83 maps. In the 5th edition (1868–1874) we can see the hand of the master clearer, as the maps become more uniform and the style of the 'Gotha School' becomes more distinct.

== Fame for the armchair traveller ==
Petermann was sometimes accused of being an 'armchair' geographer as he never traveled wide or experienced new discoveries with his own eyes, but the quality of the maps and geographic ideas he produced proves the accusation unfair. Some people are better at observing and describing circumstances and phenomena, others are better at interpretation of data. Petermann's greatest accomplishment lay in the interpretation and evaluation of sometimes contradictory sources, and his great legacy is that he was able to develop this faculty in most of his pupils in such a fine way that geography at large has profited from it ever since. Should one criticize the journal under his direction for not being geographically innovative then one may come nearer to the truth. Many articles are of a descriptive physical nature, with many intimate details in the explorers' colloquial style, and hardly any tries to find explanations for the physical phenomena. Most emphasis is laid on geomorphology and geology — old disciplines by then with their own technical language already — meteorology, botany and biology. Articles on anthropogeography usually reach no further than ethnographic descriptions of regions. It is still the era of data-gathering and in this they were not far beyond the cameralistic nature of the first half of the nineteenth century. One should have expected more articles concerning (parts of) Europe, but a count in the annuals for 1860–1864 shows that only 16% of the articles and 22% of the Kleinere Mitteilungen (small communications) concerned Europe. As accommodation one might say that the journal, though geographic by nature, was aimed at popular use. That was one of its strengths, as shown by its large circulation.

"Petermann’s achievement falls in a period in which raw material was gathered, especially through explorations. It was the flowering of geographic dilettantism. Interest was not only stirred by news as such, but the news in itself was interesting, because every educated person without special prior knowledge could understand it."

According to Weller, Petermann signed 226 articles in Petermanns Geographische Mitteilungen, including 41 on Africa, 98 on the Polar regions and 37 on the history and use of cartography. The same source puts his total production of maps at 535, including his maps for the Stieler, the Physical atlas and several miscellaneous items. Stams, using the ten-year indexes, counts 280 maps in Petermanns Geographische Mitteilungen that can be said to have been constructed and edited by him.

== Slipping and death ==
At the end of the 1870s geography started to change its objects and goals, which upset the previously important position of what was then called the 'Gotha Academy'. When Charles Darwin published The Descent of Man it was the beginning of the expansion of human geography, which till then was only rarely focused upon, except in the field of ethnography. The physical-deterministic view of humanity that followed led to the rise of the branch of geography we now call anthropogeography, especially after 1875, when Friedrich Ratzel (1844–1904) was the first new professor of geography appointed in München and later Leipzig (only Carl Ritter ever before had been professor of geography worldwide).

In 1856 Petermann had married Clara Leslie and had two daughters with her. They were divorced in 1875. A year later he married for the second time. As time wore on he seemed to have suffered more and more from family problems. It is also supposed that for many years he suffered from manic-depressive moods and he seemed to have always kept a revolver in close proximity. All these changes and troubles may have contributed to the fact that Petermann died by his own hand at Gotha on 25 September 1878. The fact that Gotha was becoming less exclusively the center of exploration – which so enchanted the large masses—and became more scientifically focused might also have played a role. In 1902 J.G. Bartholomew wrote: "It is only a fair tribute to Augustus Petermann to say that no one has done more than he to advance modern cartography, and no man has ever left a more fitting monument to himself than his Mitteilungen, which still bears his name, and under the editorship of Dr. Supan, is the leading geographical authority in all countries. But to the absorbing fascination of his work Petermann sacrificed all other interests in life and died a martyr to geography". That fame perished quickly was shown by Hermann Wagner in his article of 1912, when he commemorates the merits of the Gotha epoch under Petermann and finds that nobody up till then had written about the making of the history of geography and cartography and that all those pioneers were all but forgotten, even though the journal carried Petermann's name since 1879. In 1909 a monument with Petermann's effigy from the workshop of Max Hoene-München of Gotha was erected in the Ducal gardens of Gotha, a stone's throw away from the institute where he had worked for so many years. The monument was offered by the German geographical societies. Petermann in his time was well paid by Perthes as is shown by his beautiful villa close to Gotha's railway station.

== Legacy ==
Because Petermann provided so much supporting work during his lifetime, several physical features, especially in the Arctic, were named after him. In the NIMA-database the following seven toponyms are listed: Petermann Ranges (Antarctica), Petermann Island, also in Antarctica, Petermann Ranges (Australia), Petermann Peak, Petermann Fjord, Petermann Glacier, Petermann Peninsula, Kapp Petermann. According to Hugo Wichmann, Capt. Bullock was probably the first to name a physical feature after Petermann, on a printed English chart of 1860. In the same report he counts thirteen features in Asia, Australia and New Zealand, and the Arctic and Antarctic regions, named between 1860 and 1874. Some of them were renamed by other explorers and one turned out not to exist. Petermann Land, which Julius Payer thought to have sighted from Cape Fligely in Franz Josef Land, later proved nonexistent. A crater on the Moon was given the name Petermann crater, situated halfway between Mare Humboldtianum and Peary in the northern polar region.

Petermann thought that the naming of newly discovered physical features was one of the privileges of a map-editor, especially as he was fed up with encountering toponyms like 'Victoria', 'Wellington', 'Smith', 'Jones', etc. He writes: "While constructing the new map to specify the detailed topographical portrayal and after consulting with and authorization of messr. [Theodor] v[on] Heuglin and count Karl Graf von Waldburg-Zeil I have entered 118 names in the map: partly they are the names derived from celebrities of arctic explorations and discoveries, arctic travellers anyway as well as excellent friends, patrons, and participants of different nationalities in the newest northpolar expeditions, partly eminent German travellers in Africa, Australia, America ..." So the accompanying map of Svalbard is larded with features named after Barth, Behm, Berghaus, Bessel, Brehm, Breusing, Heuglin, Hochstetter, Koldewey, Lange, Mauch, Oetker, Payer, Perthes, Petermann, Ravenstein, Weyprecht, and Wilhelm.

== The end of an era ==
In 1992 Justus Perthes Verlag, the publisher of PGM, was taken over by Ernst Klett Schulbuchverlag in Stuttgart, altogether with 'Justus Perthes Geographische Verlagsanstalt Darmstadt' (1953–1994). Ernst Klett Verlag continued to run the Perthes publishing house until 2016 in Gotha. In 2003 the Perthes archives (185,000 maps, incl. abt. 11,000 sea charts and abt. 4,000 large size school wall maps, 120,000 geographic publications incl. a few thousand atlases, and 800 m of business archives) were bought by the Free State of Thüringen. In 2004, after 149 years of publication, the journal Petermann’s Geographische Mitteilungen ceased to be published. The municipality of Gotha bought in 2010 the former business premises and the accompanying grounds on Justus-Perthes-Strasse 1–9 and Gotthardstrasse 6. Since 2015, the huge Perthes archive is located at Perthesforum in Gotha, one of the most modern archive facilities in Germany, with around 11,000 square meters of total space for multiple users. The investment in what was then "Thuringia's largest cultural project" amounted to more than 18 million euros. built with funding from the EU, the German federal government and the Thuringian state government. The Perthes family villa at Gotthardstrasse nevertheless was demolished in July 2012 for lack of development options. Many of the letters Petermann sent or received have been saved for future study, as also are the drafts he made for many maps, and are kept in the Perthes Collection of the University of Erfurt Gotha Research Library at 'Perthesforum'.

== Gallery ==
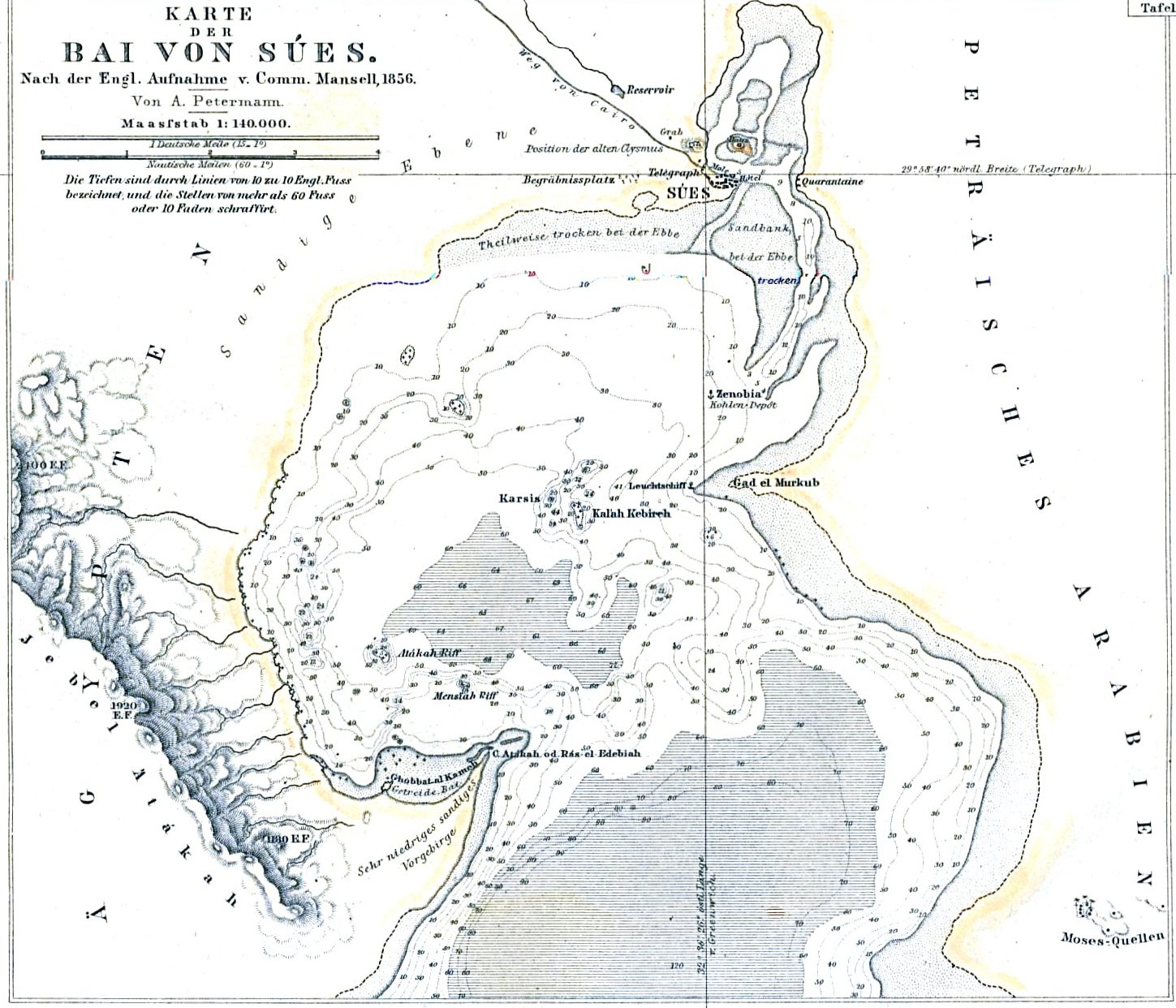
Petermann's map of the bay of Suez (1856)

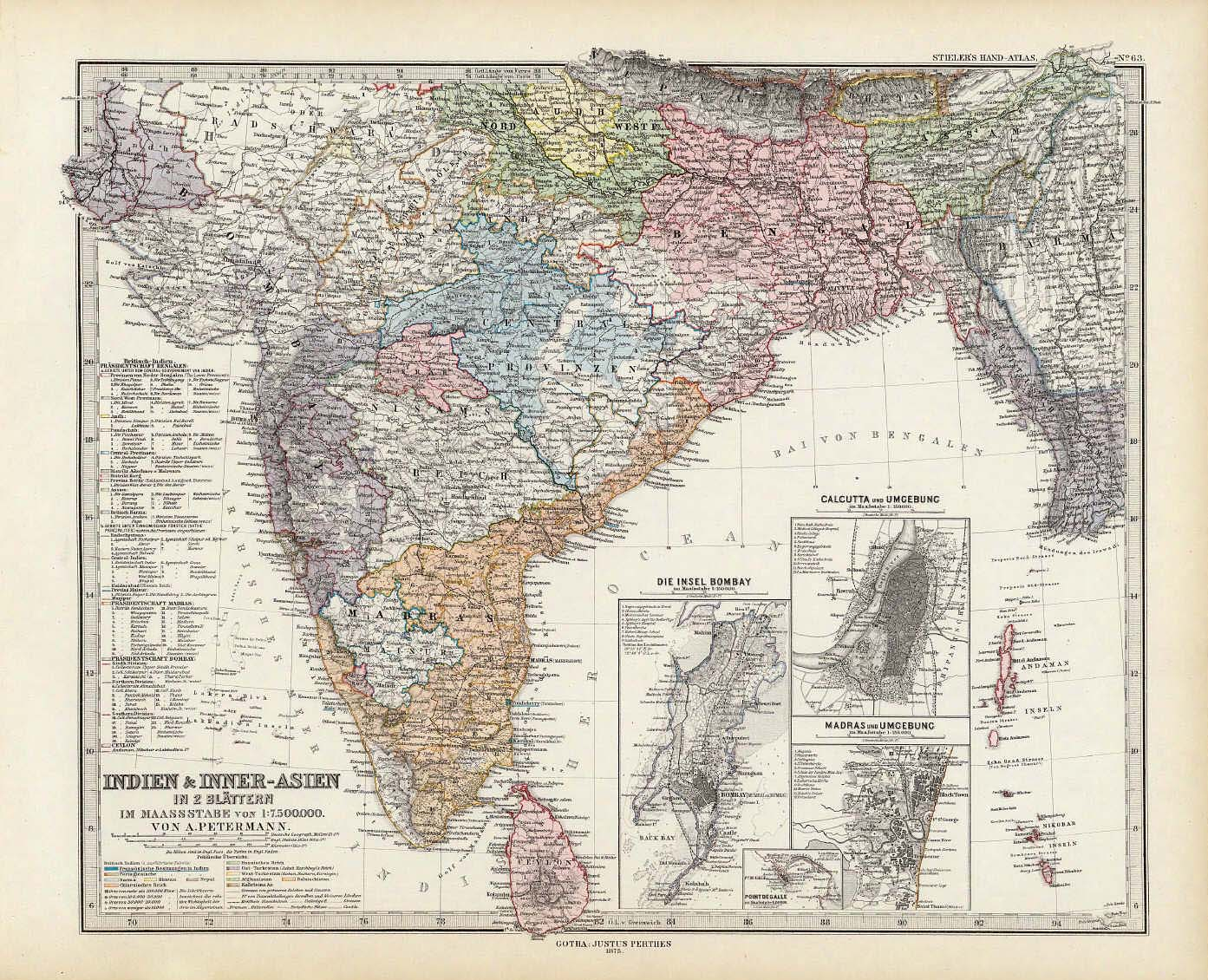
A page from Stielers Handatlas with credit, "Von A. Petermann." Many of his maps are credited in German as "Von A. Petermann." meaning, "By A. Petermann."

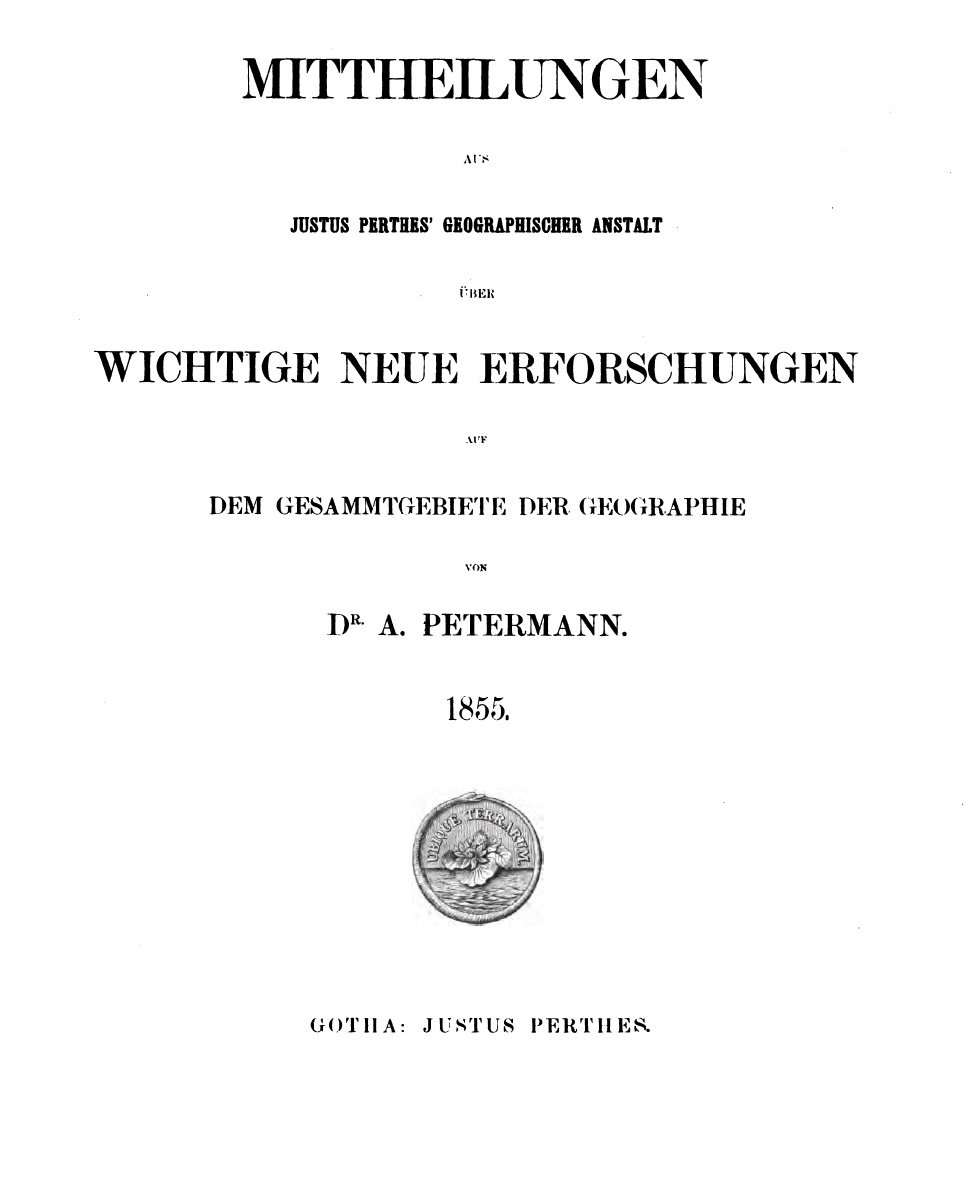
Front page of the 1st edition of Petermanns Geographische Mitteilungen (1855)

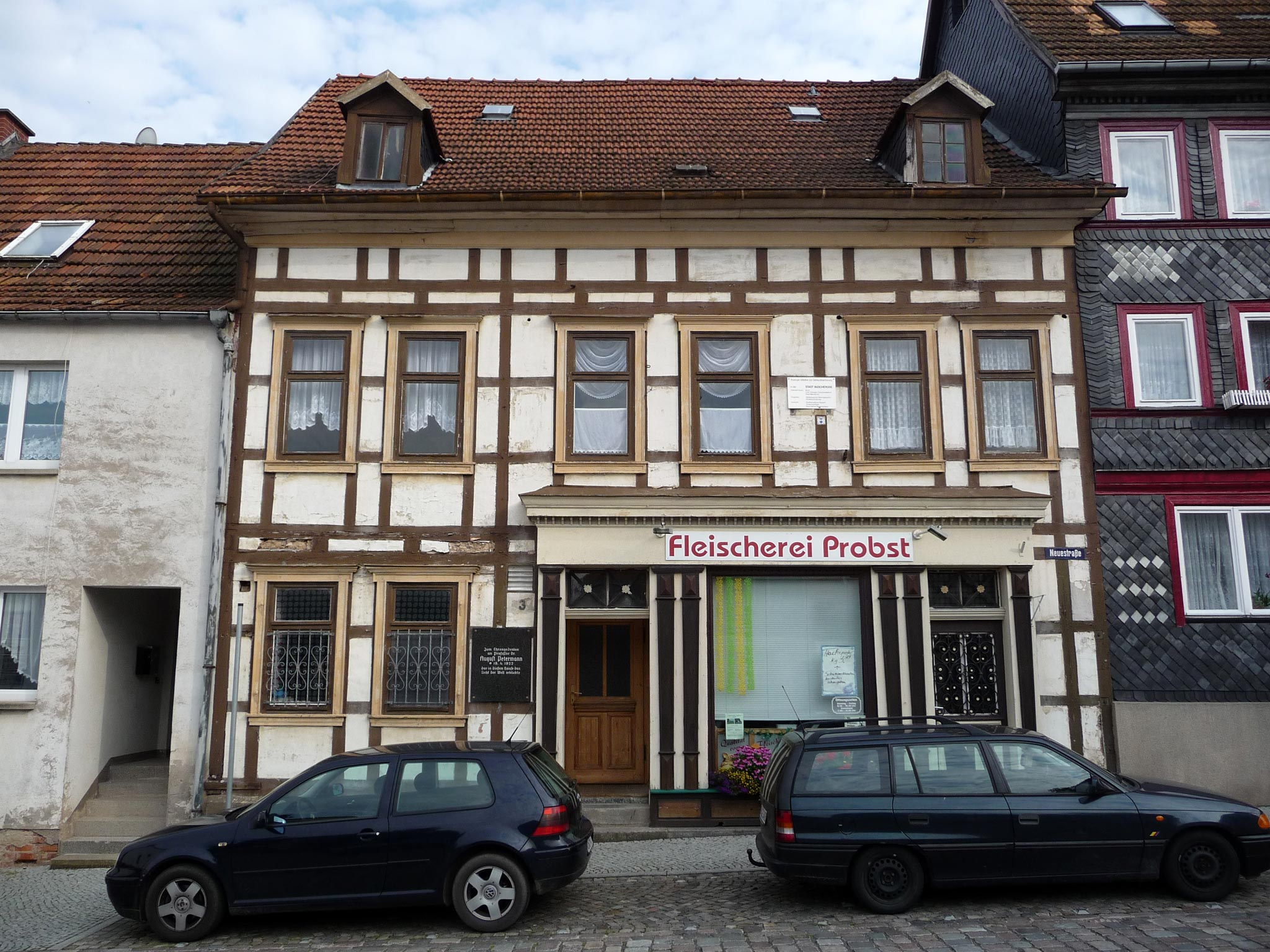
The house where Petermann was born: Neue Straße 3, Bleicherode

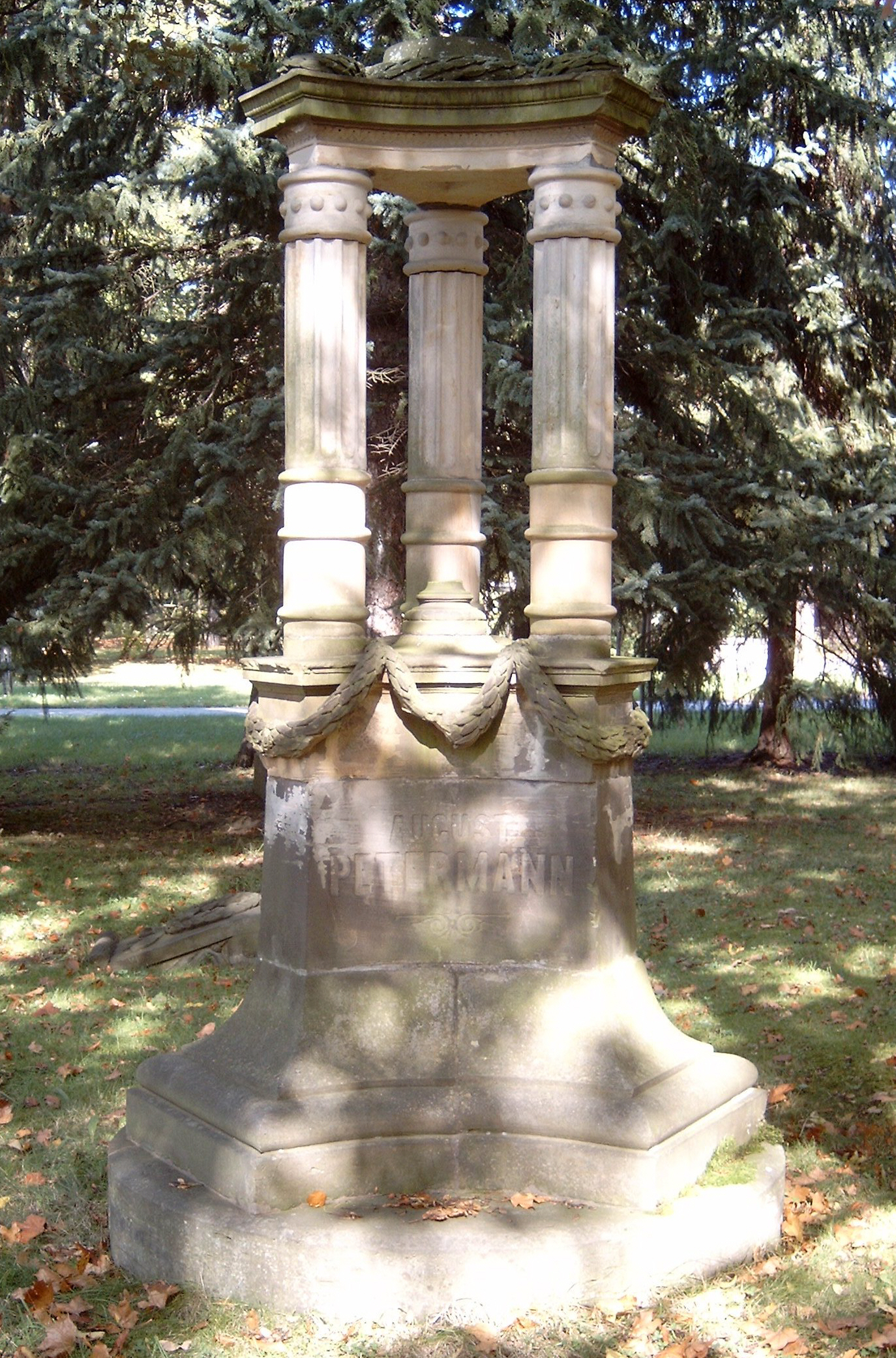
Petermann's grave at the cemetery of Gotha

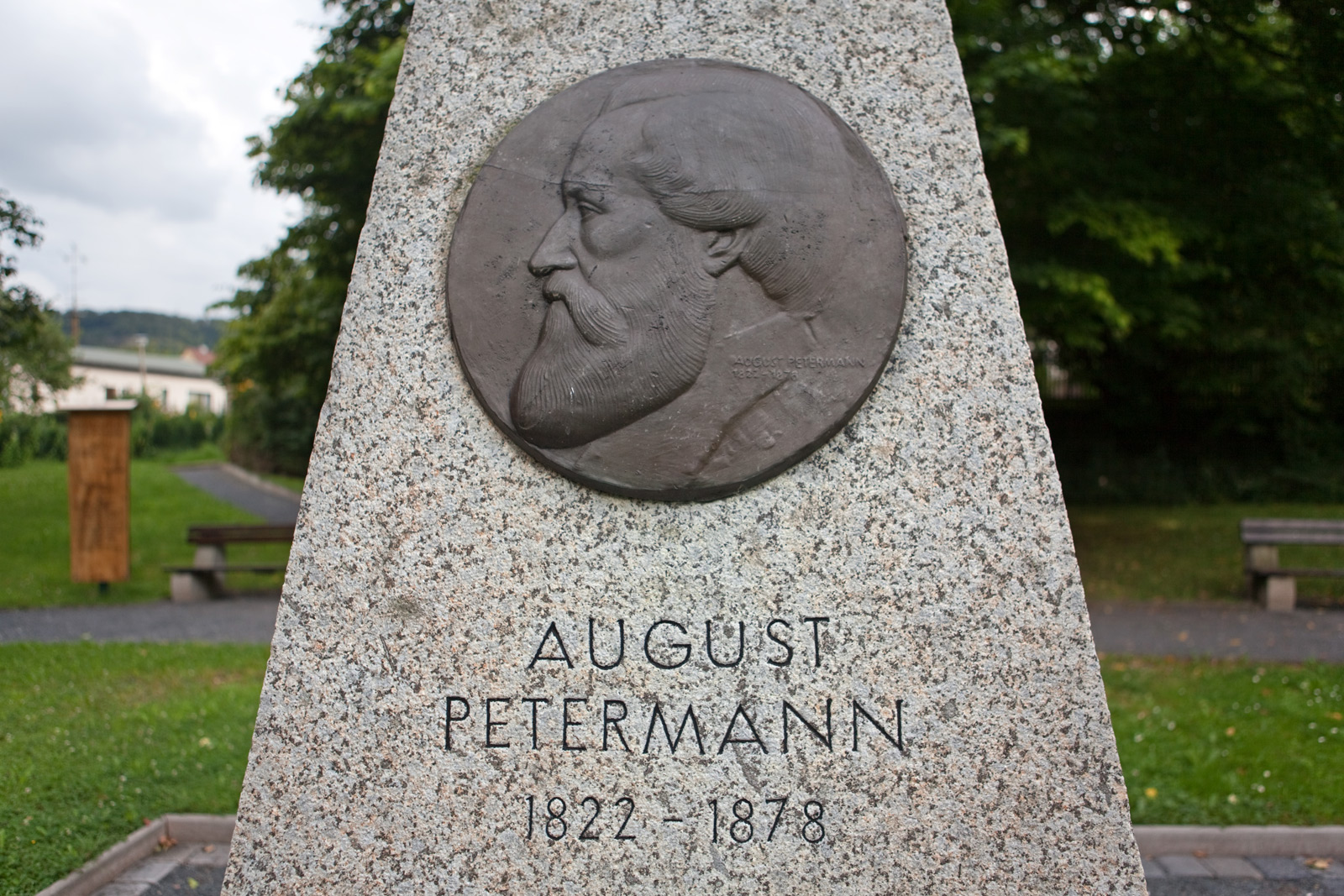
Memorial for August Petermann in his hometown Bleicherode

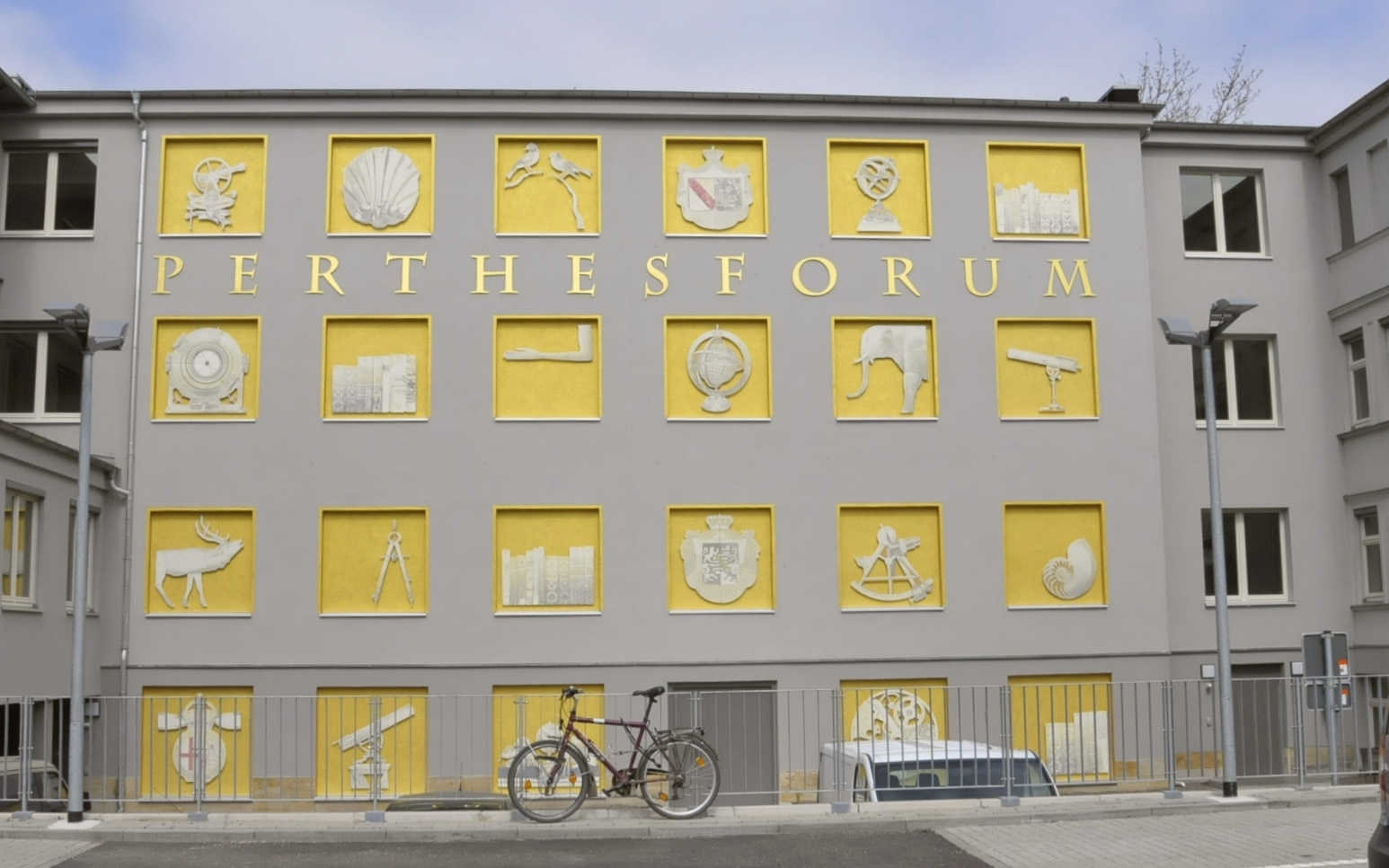
Perthesforum

== See also ==
- Germania (ship, 1869)
