= Credner =

Credner may refer to:

- Carl Friedrich Heinrich Credner (1809–1876), German geologist
- Carl Hermann Credner (1841–1913), German earth scientist
- Credner Glacier, glacier on Mount Kilimanjaro in Tanzania
