= Carl Credner =

Carl Credner may refer to:

- Carl Friedrich Heinrich Credner (1809–1876), German geologist
- Carl Hermann Credner (1841–1913), his son, German earth scientist
