= List of glaciers in Africa =

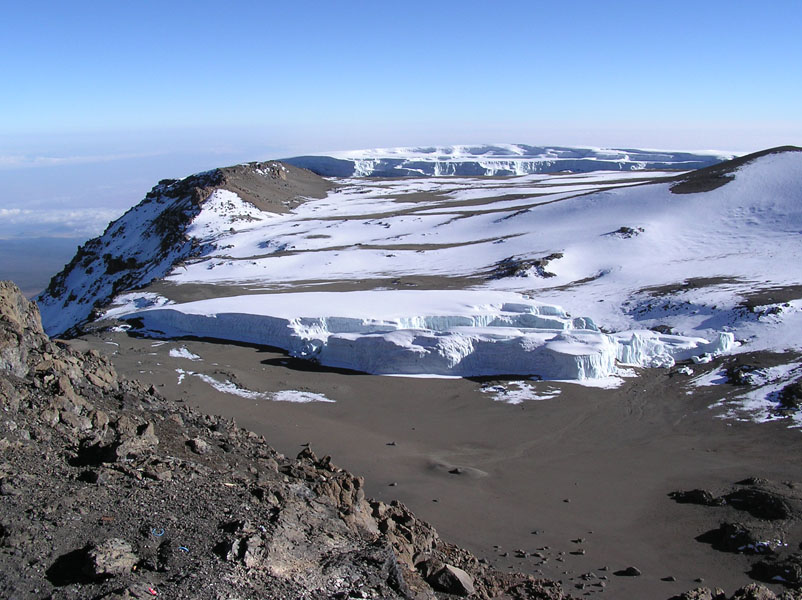
Furtwängler Glacier (foreground) on Mount Kilimanjaro as it appeared in August 2003. Behind the glacier are snowfields and the Northern Icefield.

Africa, specifically East Africa, has contained glacial regions, possibly as far back as the last glacial maximum 10,000 to 15,000 years ago. Seasonal snow does exist on the highest peaks of East Africa as well as in the Drakensberg Range of South Africa, the Stormberg Mountains, and the Atlas Mountains in Morocco. Currently, the only remaining glaciers on the continent exist on Mount Kilimanjaro, Mount Kenya, and the Rwenzori.

== List of glaciers ==
=== Kenya ===
(All located on the upper slopes of Mount Kenya)

- Cesar Glacier
- Diamond Glacier
- Darwin Glacier (Kenya)
- Forel Glacier
- Gregory Glacier
- Heim Glacier
- Josef Glacier
- Kraph Glacier
- Lewis Glacier
- Northey Glacier
- Tyndall Glacier

=== Rwenzori Mountains ===
- Speke Glacier
- Elena
- Stanley
- Baker

=== Tanzania ===
All Tanzanian glaciers are located on the summit of Mount Kilimanjaro. The mountain had 16 named glaciers and three icefields in the middle of the 20th century but by the 1990s, at least 4 glaciers had disappeared and the remaining glaciers had retreated.

- Arrow Glacier (a remnant of the formerly named Little Barranco Glacier)
- Balletto Glacier
- Barranco Glacier (formerly known as Great Barranco Glacier)
- Credner Glacier
- Decken Glacier
- Gold Glacier
- Drygalski Glacier (vanished)
- Eastern Ice Field (Mount Kilimanjaro)
- Furtwängler Glacier
- Great Barranco Glacier (now known as Barranco Glacier)
- Great Penck Glacier (vanished)
- Heim Glacier
- Kersten Glacier
- Little Barranco Glacier (vanished, small remnant later named Arrow Glacier)
- Little Penck Glacier
- Northern Ice Field (Mount Kilimanjaro)
- Ratzel Glacier
- Rebmann Glacier
- Southern Ice Field (Mount Kilimanjaro)
- Uhlig Glacier (vanished)

== See also ==
- Geography of Africa
- Mountains of the Moon
