= Barranco Glacier =

Glacier near Mount Kilimanjaro, Tanzania

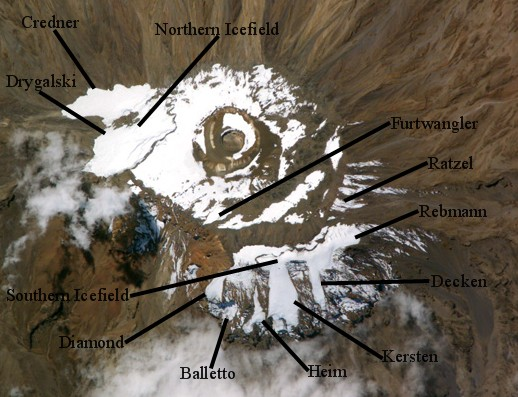
- NASA image from 2004 with locations of major glaciers on Mount Kilimanjaro. Barranco Glacier is not notated but is seen as a snowfield to the left of Diamond Glacier. Click on image to expand.

- Location within Tanzania Location within Africa
- Interactive map of Barranco Glacier
- Type: Mountain glacier
- Location: Mount Kilimanjaro, Tanzania
- Coordinates: 03°04′26″S 37°20′27″E
- Terminus: Talus
- Status: Retreating, possibly extinct

Barranco Glacier (once known as the Great Barranco Glacier) is near the summit of Mount Kilimanjaro in Tanzania, on the southwest slope of the peak and is a small remnant of an icecap which once crowned the top of Mount Kilimanjaro. The glacier is situated at an elevation of between 5,200 and 4,800 metres (17,100 and 15,700 ft). The Great Barranco Glacier was far larger when first documented in the late 19th century and it along with the now extinct Little Barranco Glacier may have been fed by the Furtwängler Glacier which is on the top of the mountain. By 2011, Barranco Glacier was reduced to two small disconnected and dormant ice bodies.

== See also ==
- Retreat of glaciers since 1850
- List of glaciers in Africa
