= Northern Ice Field (Mount Kilimanjaro) =

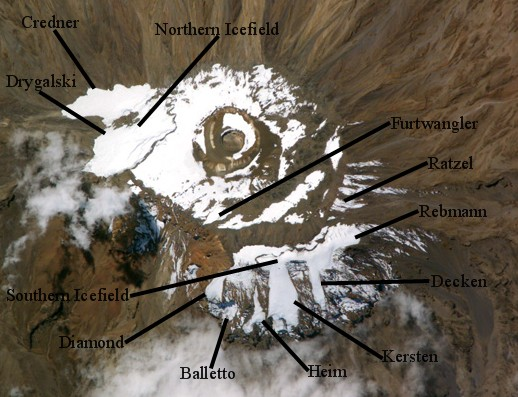
- NASA image from 2004 with locations of major glaciers on Mount Kilimanjaro. Northern Ice Field is at left. Click on image to expand.

- Location within Tanzania Location within Africa
- Interactive map of Northern Ice Field
- Type: Mountain glacier/icecap
- Location: Mount Kilimanjaro, Tanzania
- Coordinates: 03°03′30″S 37°20′55″E
- Terminus: Barren rock
- Status: Stagnant ice and retreating

The Northern Ice Field is near the summit of Mount Kilimanjaro in Tanzania, on the west slope of the peak. The Northern Ice Field and Eastern Ice Fields were connected to the Southern Ice Field and formed part of a continuous body of glacial ice atop Mount Kilimanjaro when first scientifically examined in 1912. By 1962 the Southern Ice Field separated from the Northern Ice Field and then by 1975 the Eastern Ice Field did as well. In 1912, the glaciated areas atop Mount Kilimanjaro covered 11.40 square kilometres (4.40 sq mi); by 2011 this had been reduced to 1.76 square kilometres (0.68 sq mi), an 85 percent loss. At one time, ice flowing off the Northern Ice Field fed numerous glaciers, including, north to south, the Credner, Drygalski, Great Penck and Little Penck Glaciers.

The Northern Ice Field is the largest body of ice remaining on Mount Kilimanjaro, with an area of 0.95 square kilometres (0.37 sq mi), when measured in 2007. During the exceptionally cold period known as the Younger Dryas, which occurred approximately 12,800 and 11,500 years BP (between 10,800 and 9500 BC), Mount Kilimanjaro may have been ice-free. While conditions during the Younger Dryas were cold enough to support ice, it was also exceptionally dry, so much so that the region where Mount Kilimanjaro is located was semi-desert. Ice core samples taken from the Northern Ice Field date only from the end of the Younger Dryas and have been dated at 11,500 years. Dust deposits in the ice core samples coincide with periods of suspected warming conditions such as the Medieval Warm Period (1000–1270 AD). The ice cores also indicate that during the Little Ice Age (1270–1850 AD), the Northern Ice Field and other glaciated areas on Mount Kilimanjaro likely expanded; this was due to not just to cooling temperatures, but also a wetter climate. Ice cores drilled into the Northern Ice Field in 2000 went through the glacier to bedrock, a total distance of just over 50 m (160 ft).

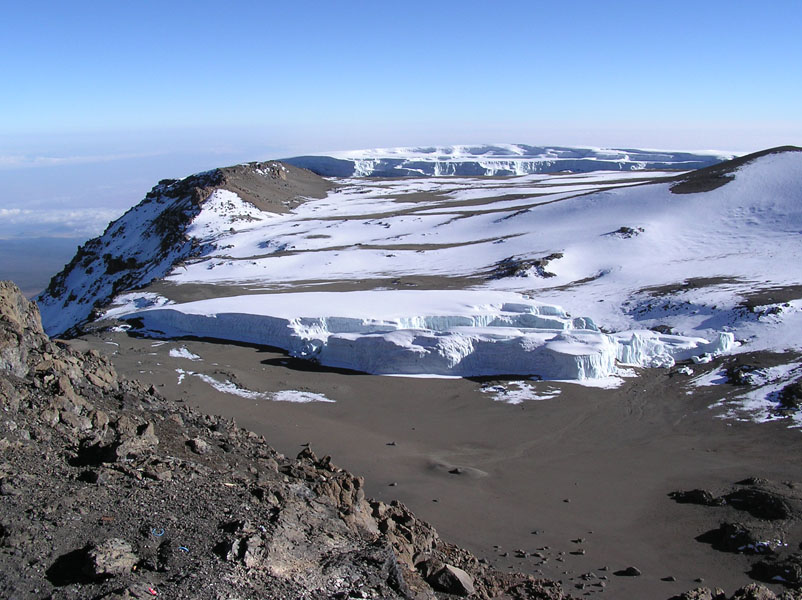
The Northern Ice Field can be seen near the top of the image in the background. In the foreground lie seasonal snow and the Furtwängler Glacier.

The current state of retreat of the glaciers on Mount Kilimanjaro has been attributed to both warmer and drier conditions than were present during the Little Ice Age. Tropical glaciers tend to be more greatly impacted by moisture than those found in the mid-latitudes or polar zones and drier conditions can lead to higher percentages of glacial loss due to the higher amount of radiational heating in tropical zones, though most of the tropical glacial loss is still primarily attributed to a warming climate.

This pattern of retreat is not anticipated to change and most if not all the ice on top of Mount Kilimanjaro may be gone by 2040. Since 1984, the Northern Ice Field developed a hole near its center point which by 2003 had opened into a canyon exposing rocks for the first time in 11,000 years. By 2011, the Northern Ice Field had split in two. The retreat is not just along the margins. Between 2000 and 2007, the Northern Ice Field thinned by an average of 1.9 m (6 ft 3 in).

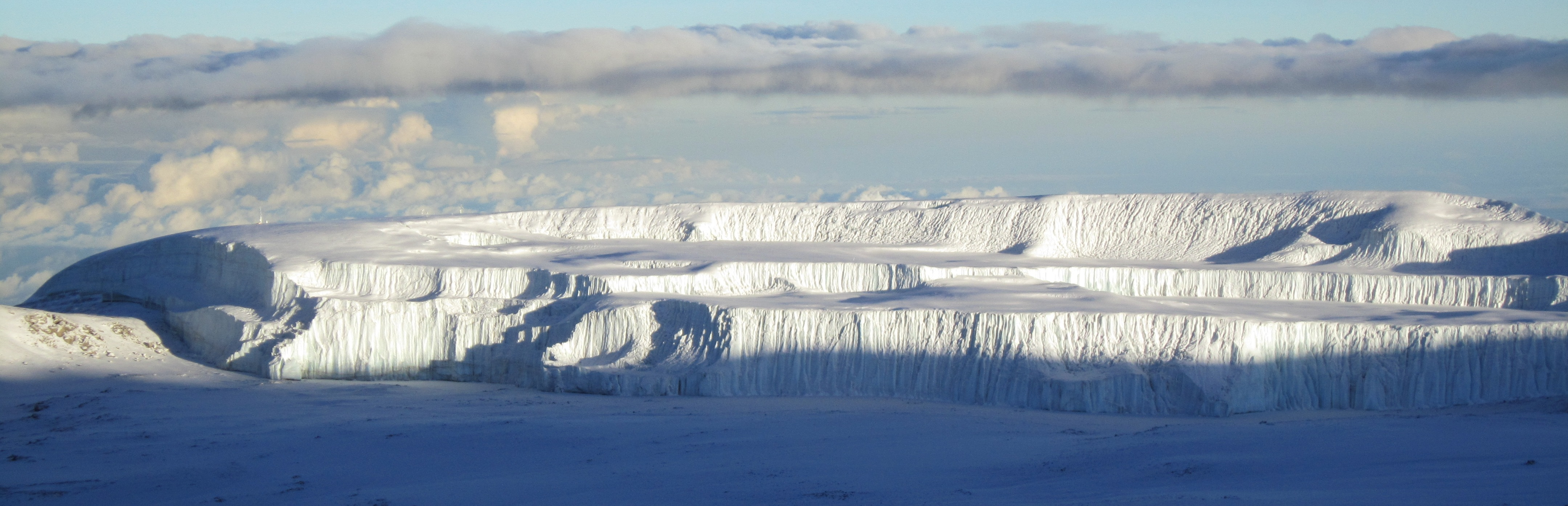
Northern Ice Field on February 20, 2012

== See also ==
- Retreat of glaciers since 1850
- List of glaciers in Africa
