= Drygalski Glacier =

Drygalski Glacier may refer to:

- Drygalski Glacier (Antarctica)
- Drygalski Glacier (Tanzania) on Mount Kilimanjaro
