= Little Penck Glacier =

Glacier on Mount Kilimanjaro, Tanzania

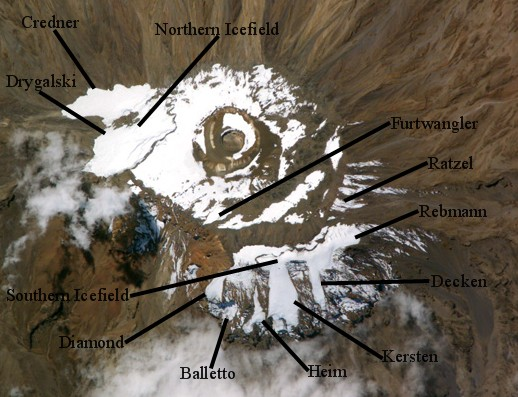
- NASA image from 2004 with locations of major glaciers on Mount Kilimanjaro. Little Penck Glacier is not shown. Click on image to expand.

- Location within Tanzania Location within Africa
- Interactive map of Little Penck Glacier
- Type: Mountain glacier
- Location: Mount Kilimanjaro, Tanzania
- Coordinates: 03°03′36″S 37°20′13″E
- Terminus: Barren rock
- Status: Stagnant ice

Little Penck Glacier is on Mount Kilimanjaro in Tanzania, on the west slope of the peak. Once extending from the Northern Ice Field, the glacier detached from the icefield by 1992. A sizeable but stagnant ice body remains near the 1912 historical terminal end of the glacier. The now vanished Great Penck and Uhlig Glaciers once flanked Little Penck Glacier to the north and south, respectively.

== See also ==
- Retreat of glaciers since 1850
- List of glaciers in Africa
