= Great Penck Glacier =

Glacier in Tanzania

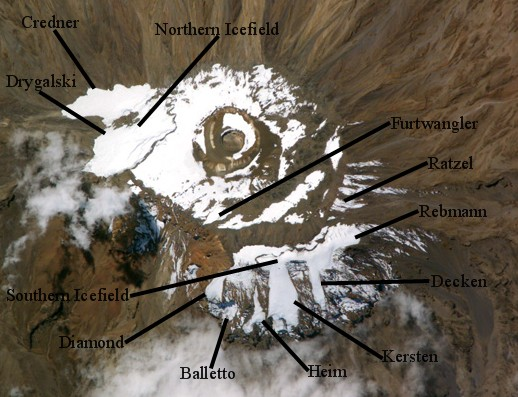
- NASA image from 2004 with locations of major glaciers on Mount Kilimanjaro. Great Penck Glacier is not shown as it disappeared by the end of the 20th century. Click on image to expand.

- Location within Tanzania Location within Africa
- Interactive map of Great Penck Glacier
- Type: Mountain glacier
- Location: Mount Kilimanjaro, Tanzania
- Coordinates: 03°03′27″S 37°20′18″E
- Terminus: Barren rock
- Status: Extinct

Great Penck Glacier was on Mount Kilimanjaro in Tanzania, on the west slope of the peak. Extending from the Northern Ice Field, the glacier once flowed 2.4 kilometres (1.5 mi), to an elevation of 4,750 metres (15,580 ft). Between the years 1962 and 1975, Great Penck Glacier separated from the Northern Icefield and disappeared. Drygalski Glacier once also existed to the north of Great Penck, while the same is true of the Little Penck Glacier, which was to the south.

== See also ==
- Retreat of glaciers since 1850
- List of glaciers in Africa
