= Balletto Glacier =

Glacier in Tanzania

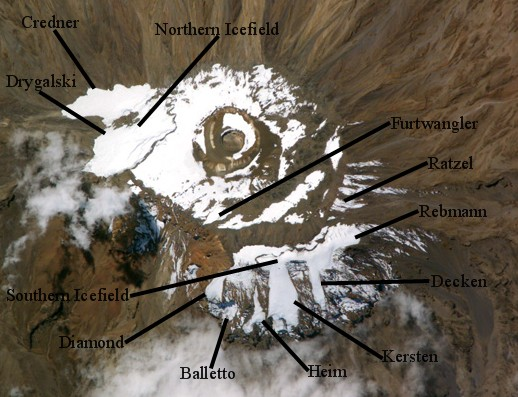
- NASA image from 2004 with locations of major glaciers on Mount Kilimanjaro. Balletto Glacier is marked at bottom left near Diamond Glacier. Click on image to expand.

- Location within Tanzania Location within Africa
- Interactive map of Balletto Glacier
- Type: Mountain glacier
- Location: Mount Kilimanjaro, Tanzania
- Coordinates: 03°04′50″S 37°20′42″E
- Length: .40 km (0.25 mi)
- Terminus: Talus
- Status: Retreating

Balletto Glacier is near the summit of Mount Kilimanjaro in Tanzania, on the southwest slope of the peak. It is a small remnant of an icecap which once crowned the top of Mount Kilimanjaro. The glacier is situated at an elevation of between 5,400 and 5,000 metres (17,700 and 16,400 ft).

Balletto Glacier is situated on the enormous 1,200-metre (3,900 ft) rock wall known as the "Breach Wall" and is below Diamond Glacier. The two glaciers are connected by an enormous icicle which hangs down the rock face as much as 90 m (300 ft).

== See also ==
- Retreat of glaciers since 1850
- List of glaciers in Africa
