= Drygalski Glacier (Tanzania) =

Glacier in Tansania

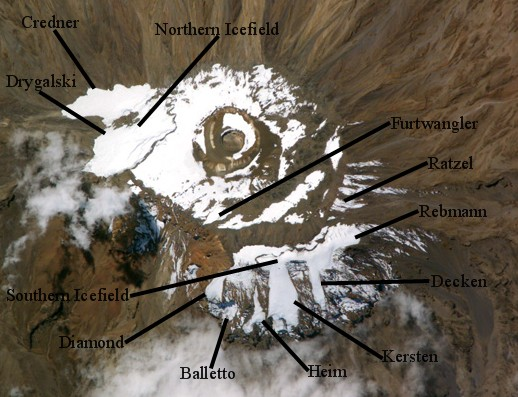
- NASA image from 2004 with locations of major glaciers on Mount Kilimanjaro. Drygalski Glacier is at upper left. Click on image to expand.

- Location within Tanzania Location within Africa
- Interactive map of Drygalski Glacier
- Type: Mountain glacier
- Location: Mount Kilimanjaro, Tanzania
- Coordinates: 03°03′21″S 37°20′48″E
- Terminus: Barren rock
- Status: Extinct

The Drygalski Glacier was a large ice sheet located on Mount Kilimanjaro in Tanzania, the highest mountain in Africa. Part of the Northern Ice Field near the mountain's summit, it dated to the last ice age, around 11,700 years ago. The glacier was discovered in 1898 by Hans Meyer, who nine years earlier had been the first person to reach Kilimanjaro's summit. It was named after Erich von Drygalski.

Between 1912 and the present day, the ice sheets on Kilimanjaro have retreated dramatically. As of 2016, only the top portions of the Northern Ice Field were reported as still being extant and the Drygalski Glacier was reported as vanished by 2022.

== Location and description ==
Drygalski Glacier was located on Mount Kilimanjaro in the Kilimanjaro Region of northern Tanzania, on the northwest slope of the peak. The glacier terminus once extended to an elevation of 4,800 metres (15,700 ft) with an origination point near the summit of Mount Kilimanjaro and was fed by the Northern Ice Field. The Great Penck Glacier once flanked Drygalski Glacier to the south and until recently, the Credner Glacier did as well to the north.

== History ==
The ice fields on Kilimanjaro formed at least as early as the end of the last ice age, 11,700 years ago. Around 4,200 years ago there was a prolonged period of drought, lasting around 300 years, during which time the glaciers remained in existence. This drought manifested in a layer of dust around 30 millimetres (1.2 in) thick under the ice sheet.

The glaciers were first seen by German geographer Hans Meyer, when he completed the first successful ascent of the mountain in 1889. Subsequent expeditions were carried out by various European explorers in the following years, but detailed analysis was not completed until 1898, when Meyer returned to spend the northern-hemisphere summer there. By the end of that exercise, carried out with German artist Ernst Platz and with the assistance of local Africans, Meyer had mapped 12 distinct glaciers. This included the Drygalski, the central glacier of three in the Northern Ice Field. Meyer and Platz left their camp on the northern side of the mountain, circled Kilimanjaro below the snow line, and then ascended up the western side of Kibo Crater. They established a further camp in a cave named Galuma and from there, Meyer proceeded up alone on 30 August, sleeping in a bivouac at 14,290 feet (4,360 m) altitude. There, he became the first person to encounter the Drygalski Glacier. He named it after Erich von Drygalski, a fellow German who had explored many of Greenland's ice sheets.

Beginning in 1912, detailed maps of the Kilimanjaro ice sheets began to be produced, with releases in 1912 and 1953 based on photogrammetry and satellite images in 1976 and 1989. Further aerial maps were produced in 2000 and later years. These maps showed that the ice sheets on the mountain were declining steadily over this period, by 1% per year in the early stages and by 2.5% from 1953 to 2007. By 2016, with climate change continuing globally, the area of ice had reduced from 20 square kilometres (7.7 sq mi) in 1880 to 1.7 square kilometres (0.66 sq mi), with the lowest extent of the ice sheet at 5,800 metres (19,000 ft) compared with 5,200 metres (17,100 ft) in 1880. The Drygalski Glacier in particular had almost entirely disappeared at this point and, by November 2021, measured only 0.41 square kilometres (0.16 sq mi). By 2022, it was reported by tour operators that the Drygalski Glacier, along with the Arrow Glacier, had disappeared entirely.

== See also ==
- List of glaciers in Africa
