= Rebmann Glacier =

Glacier on Mount Kilimanjaro, Tanzania

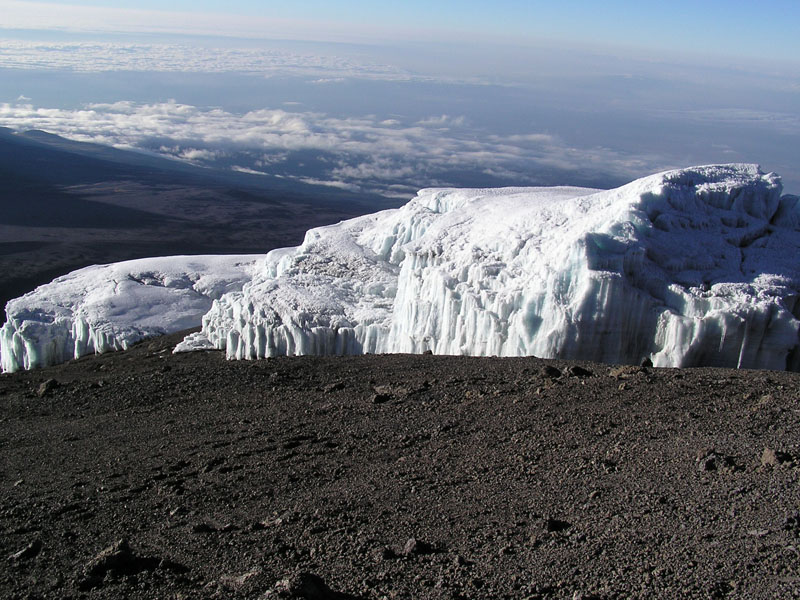
- Rebmann Glacier on the Summit of Mount Kilimanjaro in 2003

- Location within Tanzania Location within Africa
- Interactive map of Rebmann Glacier
- Type: Mountain glacier
- Location: Mount Kilimanjaro, Tanzania
- Coordinates: 3°4′52″S 37°21′47″E
- Terminus: Moraine/talus
- Status: Retreating

The Rebmann Glacier is an active glacier located near the summit of Mount Kilimanjaro in Tanzania. It is a small remnant of an enormous ice cap which once crowned Kilimanjaro. This ice cap has retreated significantly over the past century; between 1912 and 2000, 82 percent of the glacial ice on the mountain disappeared.

Rebmann Glacier is named for German missionary and explorer Johann Rebmann, who was the first European explorer to report observations of snow and glaciers atop Kilimanjaro, in 1848.

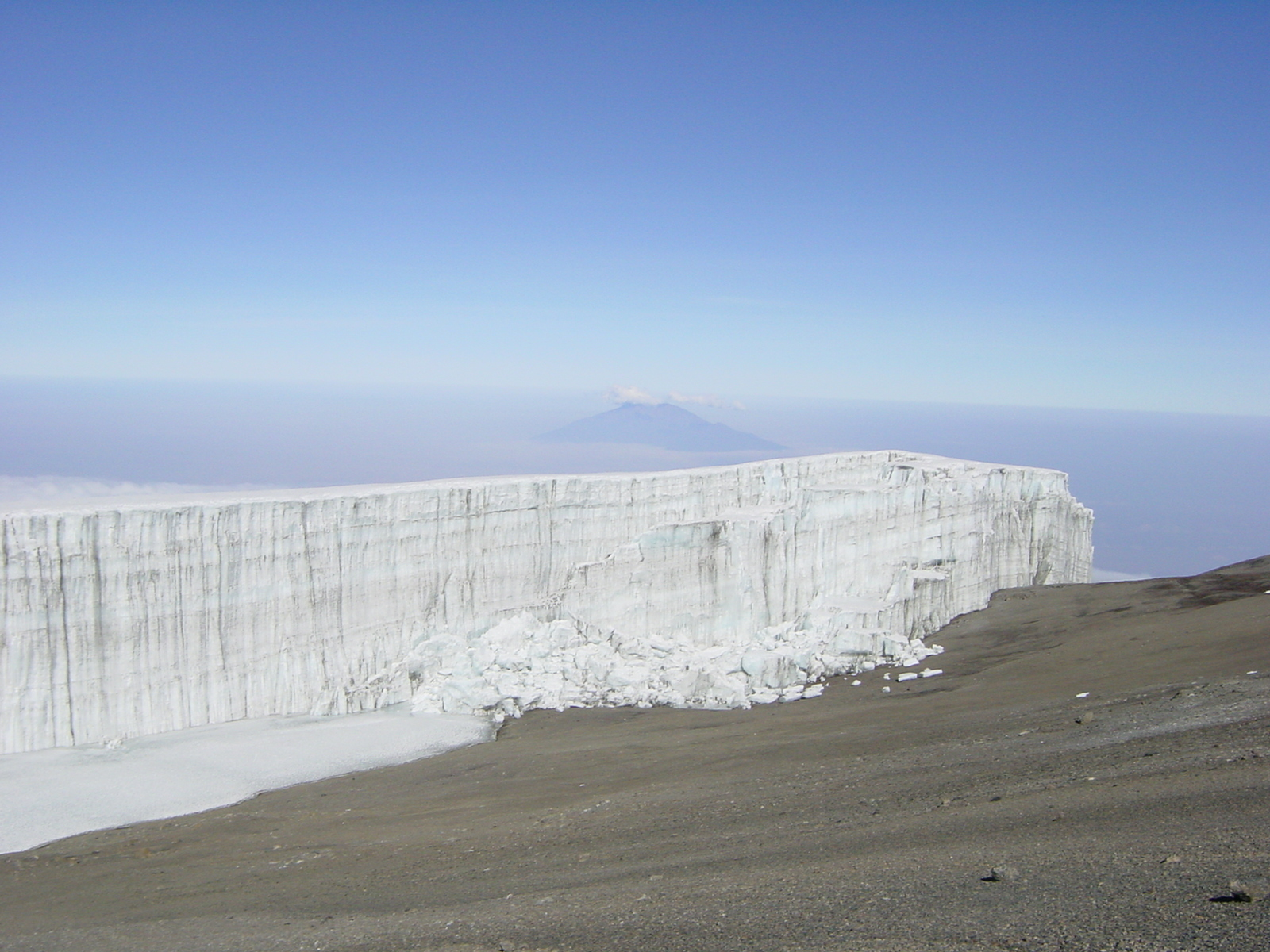
Vertical margin wall of the Rebmann Glacier in 2005 with Mount Meru, which is 70 kilometres (43 mi) away, in the background.

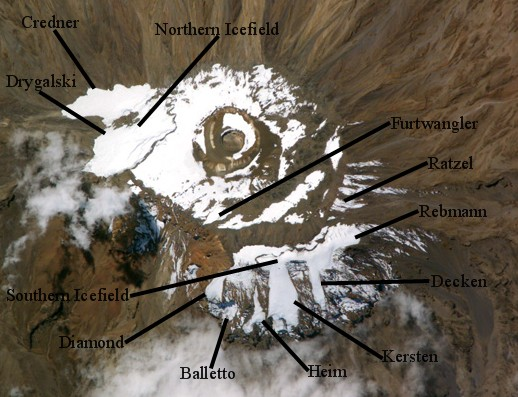
NASA image from 2004 with locations of major glaciers on Mount Kilimanjaro. Areas not identified are generally small remnant glaciers or snowfields.

== See also ==
- Retreat of glaciers since 1850
- List of glaciers in Africa
