= Western Breach =

Feature on Mount Kilimanjaro

- Gap
- Interactive map of Western Breach
- Coordinates: 3°4′14.96″S 37°20′19.29″E
- Location: Tanzania
- Part of: Mount Kilimanjaro
- Formed by: Lava flow

Western Breach is a gap, formed by lava flow, on the western outer rim of Mount Kilimanjaro's main summit, Kibo.

The Western Breach offers one of the shortest climbing routes to the summit. The core of this route, stretching from Arrow Glacier Camp to Crater Camp, involves sections of relative steepness and a high degree of exposure depending on route variation (Solid YDS Class 3 with sections of Class 4). It was temporarily closed after a rock slide accident in January 2006 killed three people.

Despite its moderate inherent risks, among experienced climbers the Western Breach is still a popular ascent route because it is very direct and more interesting than the two heavily frequented standard routes on the southeast face of Kibo.

In September 2015, San Francisco resident Scott Dinsmore was killed by a boulder while hiking up from Arrow Glacier Camp.
