= Hermann Credner =

German earth scientist (1841–1913)

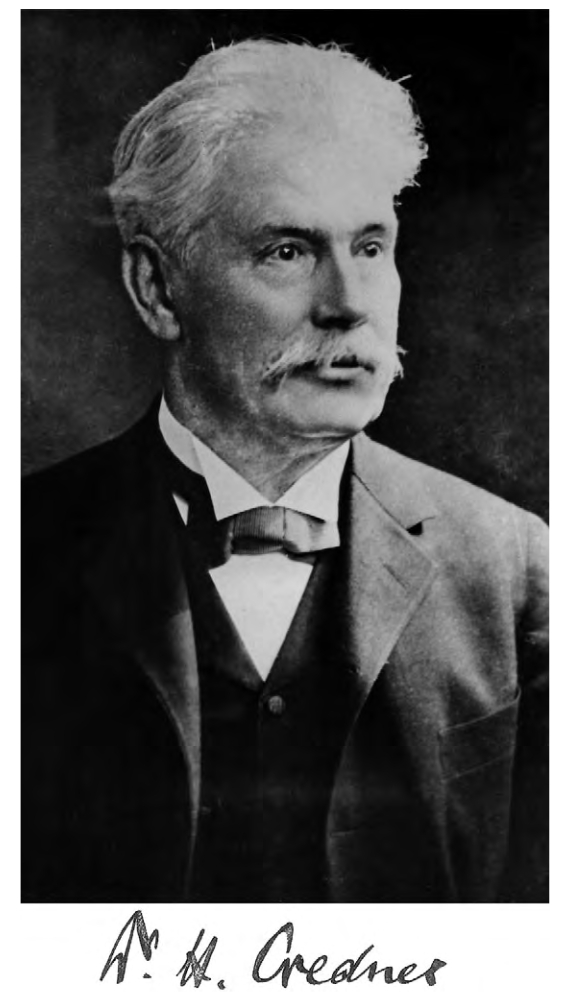
Hermann Credner in 1900

Carl Hermann Georg Credner (1 October 1841 – 21 July 1913) was a German earth scientist and the son of Carl Friedrich Heinrich Credner (usually given as Heinrich Credner). He examined the geology of Saxony and was influential in establishing Saxon geology through pioneering maps and a textbook. Credner Glacier on Mount Kilimanjaro is named after him. Geographers named Credner moraine on Spitsbergen, Credner moraine Mountains in Papua New Guinea, and Credner Waterfall in Togo after him. A manganese copper ore was, however, named after his father as crednerite while a fossil genus Credneria is named after his uncle Carl August Credner.

== Biography ==
Credner was born at Gotha, the son of Privy Council Member Heinrich and Annanée Vey. He studied at Clausthal where his father had also studied followed by Breslau and Göttingen, and took the degree of Ph.D. at Göttingen in 1864. From 1864 to 1868, he made extensive geological investigations in North and Central America, the results of which were published in the Zeitschrift der Deutschen Geologischen Gesellschaft, and the Neues Jahrhuch für Mineralogie. He completed his habilitation in 1869 at Leipzig under C. F. Naumann. In 1870, he was appointed professor of geology in the University of Leipzig, and, in 1872, became director of the Geological Survey of Saxony. He became a full professor in 1895.

During the Franco-German War of 1870 he served with the volunteer medical corps. In 1872 he married Marie Riebeck, daughter of Adolph Carl Riebeck (1821–1883). They had six daughters.

Credner took an interest in the stegocephala and dinosauria of Rotlegen near Dresden. He examined glaciation, and the formation of loess. He developed geological maps of Saxony, producing overviews at a scale of 1:250,000 and one on a scale of 1:500,000. His students included Felix Wahnschaffe (1851–1914) and he collaborated with many geologists of the period including Richard Beck (1858–1919), Karl Dalmer (1855–1908), Ernst Dathe (1845–1917), Joseph Hazard (1851–1908), Otto Hermann (1859–1945), Gustav Klemm (1858–1938), Johannes Lehmann (1851–1925), Albrecht Penck (1858–1945), August Rothpletz (1853–1918), Adolf Sauer (1852–1932), Ferdinand Schalch (1848–1918), Theodor Siegert (1835–1913), Heinrich August Vater (1859–1930) and Emil Weber (1859–1928). He was also involved in establishing seismological observatories from 1902.

== Works ==
Credner wrote numerous publications on the geological formations of Saxony, and published a geological chart of the Kingdom of Saxony (1877 et seq.). He wrote Elemente der Geologie (2 vols., 1872; 7th ed., 1891), regarded as the standard manual in Germany. He also wrote memoirs on Saurians and Labyrinthodonts, for example Die Stegocephalen und Saurier (1881–93). He also wrote Die Urvierfüssler (Eotetrapoda) des sächsischen Rothliegenden (1891).

== Other sources ==
- Gilman, D. C.; Peck, H. T.; Colby, F. M., eds. (1905). "Credner, Hermann" . New International Encyclopedia (1st ed.). New York: Dodd, Mead.
- Colby, F.; Williams, T., eds. (1928). "Credner, Hermann". New International Encyclopedia. Vol. 6 (2nd ed.). New York: Dodd, Mead. p. 239.
