= Arrow Glacier =

Glacier on Mount Kilimanjaro, Tanzania

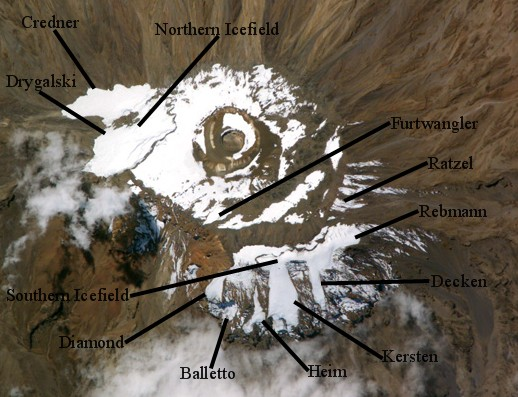
- NASA image from 2004 with locations of major glaciers on Mount Kilimanjaro. Arrow Glacier is unmarked at bottom left near Diamond Glacier. Click on image to expand.

- Location within Tanzania Location within Africa
- Interactive map of Arrow Glacier
- Type: Mountain glacier
- Location: Mount Kilimanjaro, Tanzania
- Coordinates: 03°04′00″S 37°20′40″E
- Length: .25 km (0.16 mi)
- Terminus: Talus
- Status: Retreating

Arrow Glacier is located near the summit of Mount Kilimanjaro in Tanzania, on the west slope of the peak and is a small remnant of an icecap which once crowned the summit of Mount Kilimanjaro. The glacier is situated at an elevation of between 5,470 and 5,300 metres (17,950 and 17,390 ft). Arrow Glacier is adjacent to a climbing route known as the Western Breach/Arrow Glacier Route or more commonly, the Lemosho Route. Arrow Glacier is a recently named glacial remnant that may not even exist as of 2011. It was what remained of an earlier glacier known as the Little Barranco Glacier.

== See also ==
- Retreat of glaciers since 1850
- List of glaciers in Africa
