= Carl Friedrich Heinrich Credner =

German geologist (1809–1876)

Carl Friedrich Heinrich Credner (13 March 1809 – 28 September 1876) was a German geologist.

== Biography ==
He was born in Waltershausen, Saxe-Gotha-Altenburg. He studied at the universities of Freiberg and Göttingen, and in 1836 was appointed by the Ducal Government warden of the mint. In 1839 he became surveyor of mines, in 1850 mining councilor, and in 1854 State and mining councilor. In 1858, he was appointed by the government of Hanover superior mining councilor and reporting councilor to the finance ministry, in which capacity he had under his supervision all the Hanoverian mining works, including the important ones of the Harz. From 1868 until his death, he was mining privy councilor and director of mining in the Halle district. He died at Halle in 1876.

== Work ==
As a scientist, Credner was known for his study of the geology of those regions of Germany connected with his duties in the mining industry. He discovered a compound of oxides of copper and manganese, called in his honor Crednerite.

Credner investigated the geology of the Thuringian Forest, of which he published a map in 1846. He was author of Versuch einer Bildungsgeschichte der geognostischen Verhältnisse des Thüringer Waldes (1855) and Über die Gliederung der oberen Juraformation und der Wealden-Bildung im nordwestlichen Deutschland (Prague, 1863), also of a geological map of Hanover (1865).

== Family ==
He was the father of Carl Hermann Credner, also a geologist.
