= Furtwängler Glacier =

Glacier on Mount Kilimanjaro, Tanzania

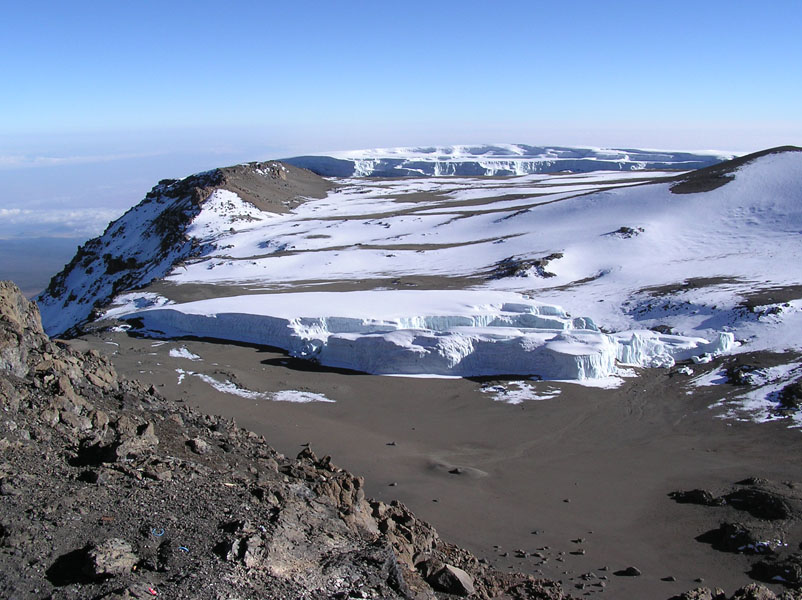
- Furtwängler Glacier (foreground) as it appeared in August 2003. Behind the glacier are snowfields and the Northern Icefield

- Location within Tanzania Location within Africa
- Interactive map of Furtwängler Glacier
- Type: Mountain glacier
- Location: Mount Kilimanjaro, Tanzania, Africa
- Coordinates: 3°4′15″S 37°21′07″E
- Area: 11,000 square metres (2.7 acres) (in 2018)
- Thickness: 6 metres (20 ft) (in 2006)
- Terminus: Moraine/talus
- Status: Retreating

Furtwängler Glacier is located near the summit of Mount Kilimanjaro in Tanzania. The glacier is named after Walter Furtwängler who, with Siegfried König, formed the fourth party to ascend to the summit of Kilimanjaro in 1912.

The glacier is a small remnant of an ice cap that once crowned the summit of Kilimanjaro. Almost 85 percent of the ice cover disappeared from October 1912 to June 2011. In 2013 it was estimated that at the then-current rate, most of the ice would disappear by 2040 and "it is highly unlikely that any ice body will remain after 2060".

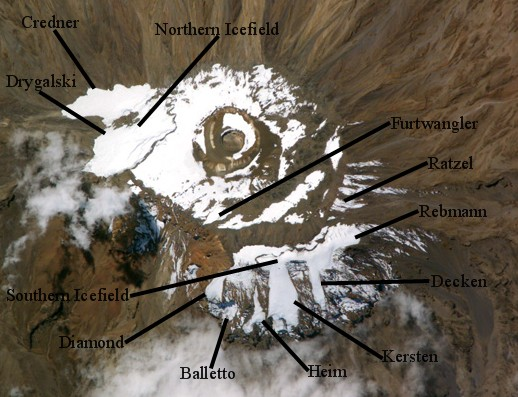
NASA image from 2004 with locations of major glaciers on Mount Kilimanjaro. Areas not identified are generally small remnant glaciers or snowfields. Click on image for detail.

Furtwängler Glacier is ephemeral, existing continuously only since about 1650 CE, which corresponds with very high levels in Kenya's Lake Naivasha and the beginning of the Maunder Minimum. Between measurements in 1976 and 2000, the area of this glacier was cut almost in half, from 113,000 square metres (1,220,000 ft^{2}) to 60,000 m^{2} (650,000 ft^{2}). By 2018 the size had shrunk to 11,000 m^{2} (120,000 ft^{2}). In 2022 it was thought that the glacier would cease to exist by 2023 at a rate of loss of 2,524 m^{2} (27,170 ft^{2}) per year.

During fieldwork conducted early in 2006, scientists discovered a large hole near the center of the glacier. This hole, extending through the 6 metres (20 feet) remaining thickness of the glacier to the underlying rock, split the glacier in two by 2007.

== See also ==
- Retreat of glaciers since 1850
- List of glaciers
