= Credner Glacier =

Glacier on Mount Kilimanjaro in Tanzania

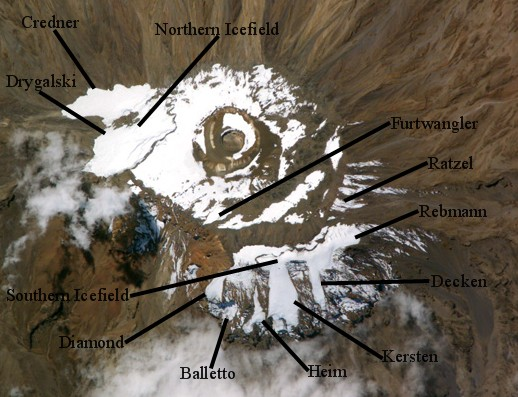
- NASA image from 2004 with locations of major glaciers on Mount Kilimanjaro. Credner Glacier is at upper left. Click on image to expand.

- Location within Tanzania Location within Africa
- Interactive map of Credner Glacier
- Type: Mountain glacier
- Location: Mount Kilimanjaro, Tanzania
- Coordinates: 03°03′11″S 37°20′58″E
- Length: 1.30 km (0.81 mi)
- Terminus: Talus
- Status: Retreating

Credner Glacier is on Mount Kilimanjaro in Tanzania, on the northwest slope of the peak and is a remnant of an icecap which once crowned the top of Mount Kilimanjaro. The glacier is situated at an elevation of between 5,800 and 5,500 metres (19,000 and 18,000 ft). Credner Glacier is one of the largest glaciers on the mountain and descends from the Northern Ice Field. Credner is rapidly retreating due to its high exposure point on the northwest slope of Mount Kilimanjaro. A report published in 2013 indicated that in another decade the glacier may no longer exist.

== Gallery ==
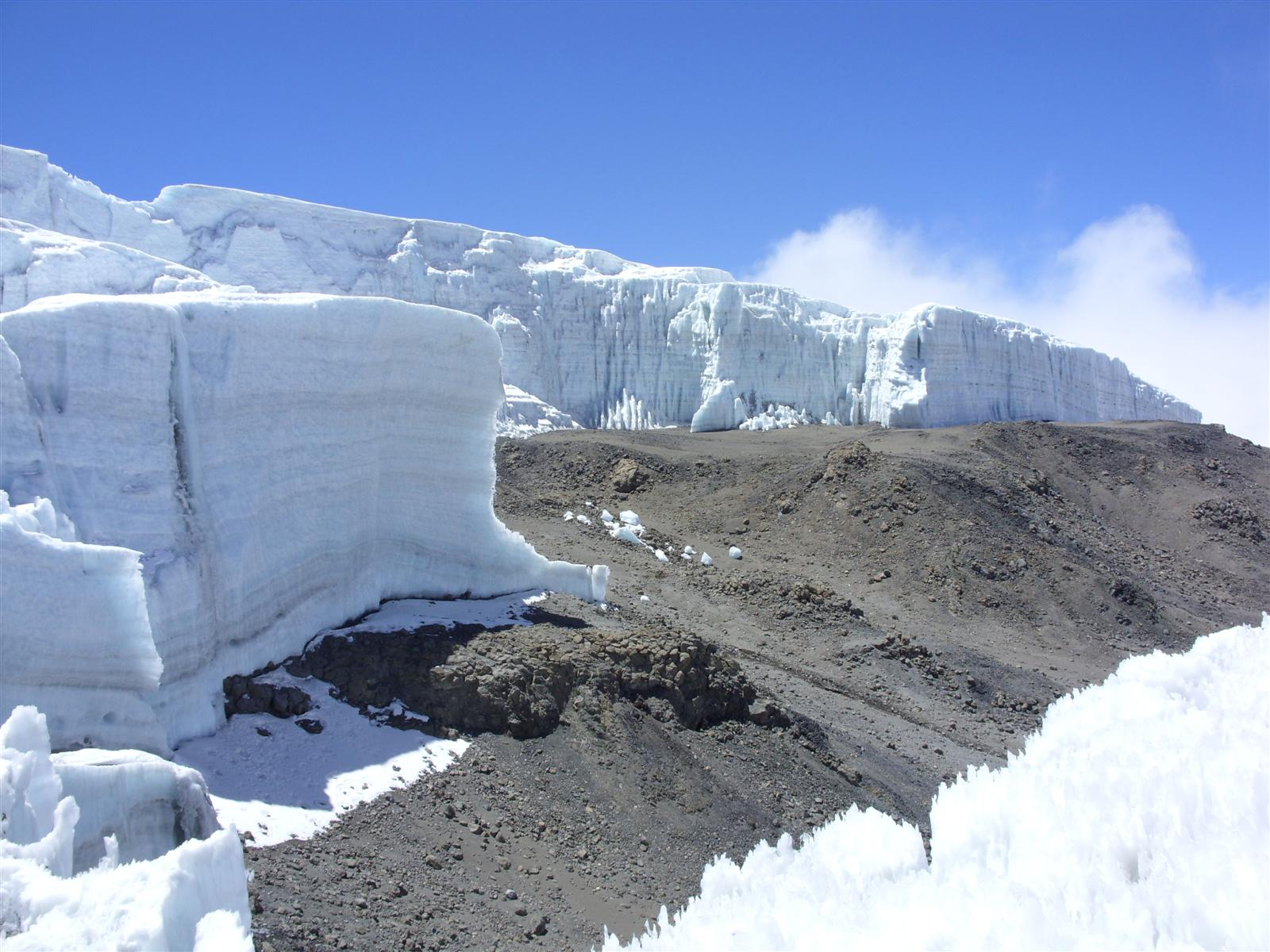
Credner Glacier and recently exposed old lava in 2009

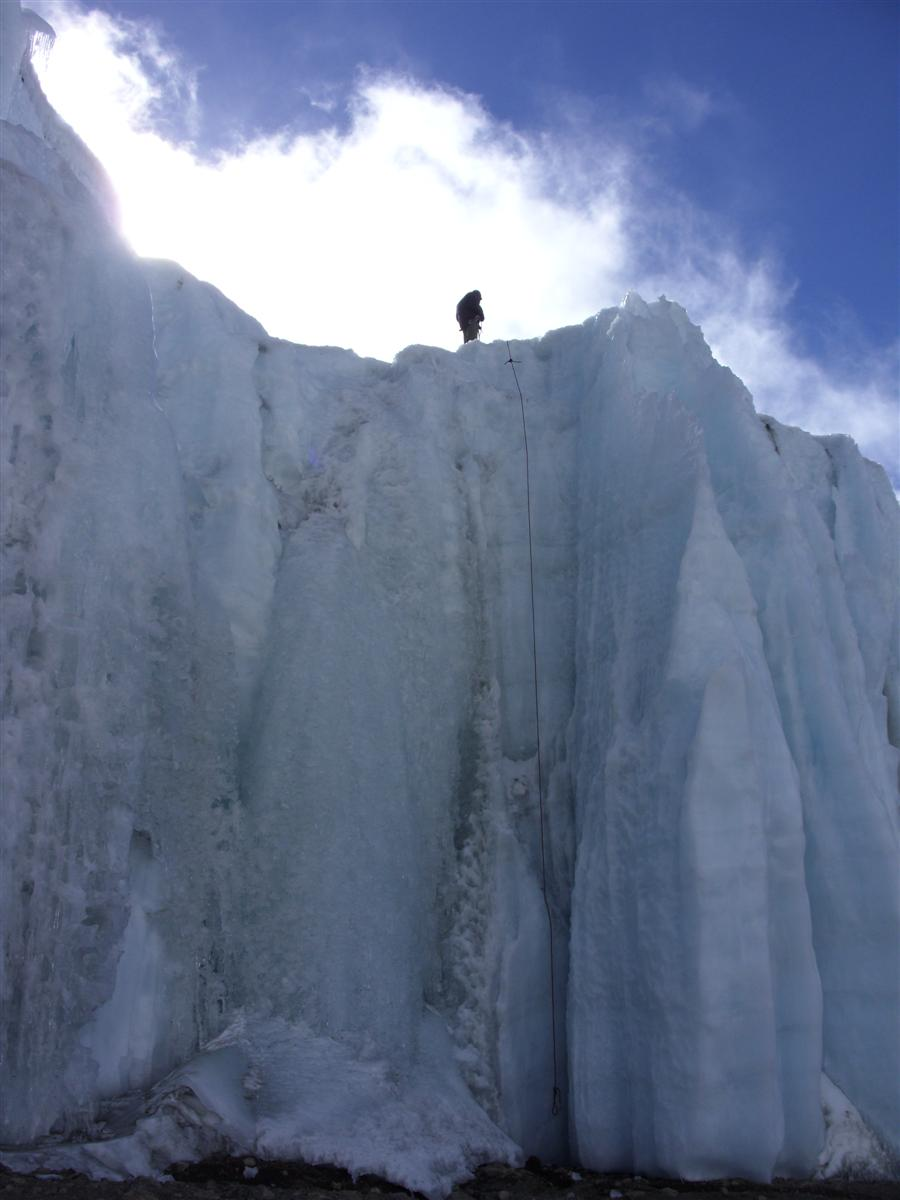
Scientist atop Credner Glacier in 2009

== See also ==
- Retreat of glaciers since 1850
- List of glaciers in Africa
