= Mount Kilimanjaro =

Mountain in Tanzania, highest in Africa

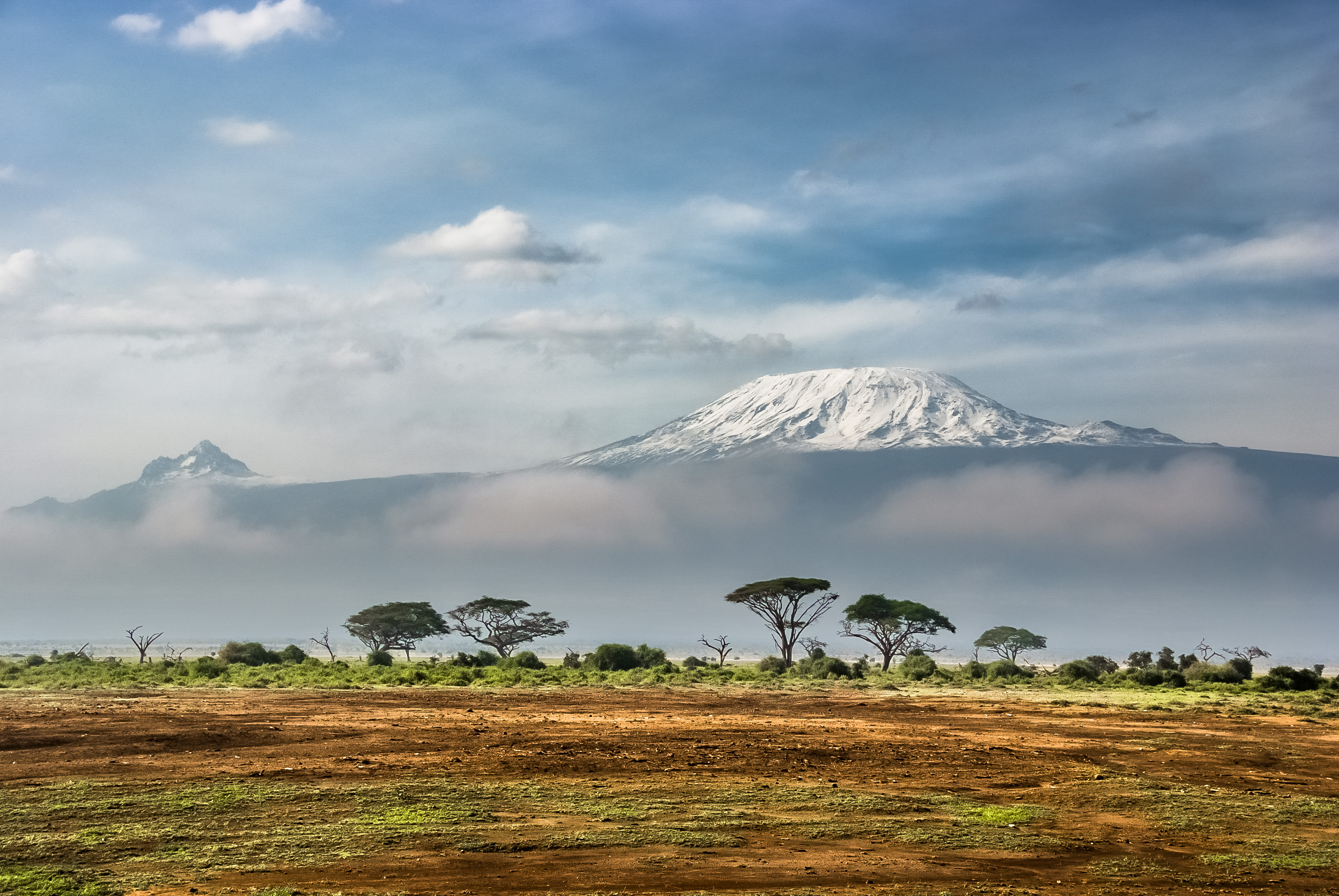
- Kilimanjaro from Amboseli National Park, Kenya

Highest point
- Elevation: 5,895 m (19,341 ft)
- Prominence: 5,895 m (19,341 ft); Ranked 4th
- Isolation: 5,510 km (3,420 mi); Ranked 4th
- Listing: Seven Summits; Country high point; Ultra
- Coordinates: 03°04′33″S 37°21′12″E

Geography
- Location within Tanzania Location within Africa Location within Earth
- Location: Kilimanjaro Region, Tanzania
- Parent range: The Eastern Rift mountains
- Topo map(s): Kilimanjaro map and guide by Wielochowski

Geology
- Formed by: Volcanism along the Gregory Rift
- Rock age: 4 million years
- Mountain type: Stratovolcano
- Last eruption: Between 150,000 and 200,000 years ago

Climbing
- First ascent: 6 October 1889 by Hans Meyer and Ludwig Purtscheller

Mount Kilimanjaro (/ˌkɪlɪmənˈdʒɑːroʊ/) is a large dormant stratovolcano in Tanzania. It is the highest mountain in Africa and the highest free-standing mountain above sea level in the world, at 5,895 m (19,341 ft) above sea level and 4,900 m (16,100 ft) above its plateau base. It is also the highest volcano in the Eastern Hemisphere and the fourth most prominent peak on Earth.

Kilimanjaro's southern and eastern slopes served as the home of the Chagga Kingdoms until their abolition in 1963 by Julius Nyerere. The origin and meaning of the name Kilimanjaro is unknown, but may mean "mountain of greatness" or "unclimbable". Although it is described in classical sources, German missionary Johannes Rebmann is credited as the first European to report the mountain's existence, in 1848. After several European attempts, Hans Meyer reached Kilimanjaro's highest summit in 1889.

The mountain was incorporated into Kilimanjaro National Park in 1973. As one of the Seven Summits, Kilimanjaro is a major hiking and climbing destination. There are seven established routes to Uhuru Peak, the mountain's highest point. Although not as technically challenging as similar mountains, the prominence of Kilimanjaro poses a serious risk of altitude sickness.

One of several mountains arising from the East African Rift, Kilimanjaro was formed from volcanic activity over two million years ago. Its slopes host montane forests and cloud forests. Multiple species are endemic to Mount Kilimanjaro, including the giant groundsel Dendrosenecio kilimanjari. The mountain possesses a large ice cap and the largest glaciers in Africa, including Credner Glacier, Furtwängler Glacier, and the Rebmann Glacier. This ice cap is rapidly shrinking, with over 80% lost in the 20th century. The cap is projected to disappear entirely by the mid-21st century.

== Toponymy ==
The origin and meaning of the name Kilimanjaro is disputed. Although the Chagga people of the Kilimanjaro Region have no name for the mountain, they call its two peaks Kipoo and Kimawenze. The peaks' names—usually rendered Kibo and Mawenzi—mean "spotted" in reference to Kibo's snow and "broken top" due to Mawenzi's jagged peak. "Kilimanjaro" may originate from the Chagga calling the mountain unclimbable—kilemanjaare or kilemajyaro—and explorers misinterpreting this as its name. This Kichagga language etymology relies on kileme, "that which defeats", or kilelema, "that which has become difficult or impossible". The -jaro could be derived from njaare, a bird, or jyaro, a caravan.

Early Western etymologies used a compound Swahili origin, with kilima translated as "mountain". In 1860, Johann Ludwig Krapf wrote that the Swahilis used the name Kilimanjaro and that it meant either "mountain of greatness" or "mountain of caravans", with a translation of njaro as greatness or jaro as "caravans". In 1885, Scottish explorer Joseph Thomson reported "white mountain" as an alternative, with njaro denoting whiteness. This Swahili etymological approach is criticized as kilima is a diminutive of mlima (mountain) and actually means "hill". However, mlima may have been misreported as kilima via conflation with the two peaks' names, Kipoo and Kimawenze.

Krapf mentions an 1849 visit with a Wakamba chief that called the mountain Kima jajeu, meaning "mountain of whiteness". Another explanation is that jyaro may refer to a god or a deity that guarded the mountain from trespassers.

In the 1880s, the mountain became part of German East Africa and was called Kilima-Ndscharo in German. In 1889, Hans Meyer reached the highest summit on Kibo, which he named Kaiser-Wilhelm-Spitze for Kaiser Wilhelm. Following the Zanzibar Revolution and the formation of Tanzania in 1964, the summit was renamed Uhuru Peak: "Freedom Peak" in Swahili.

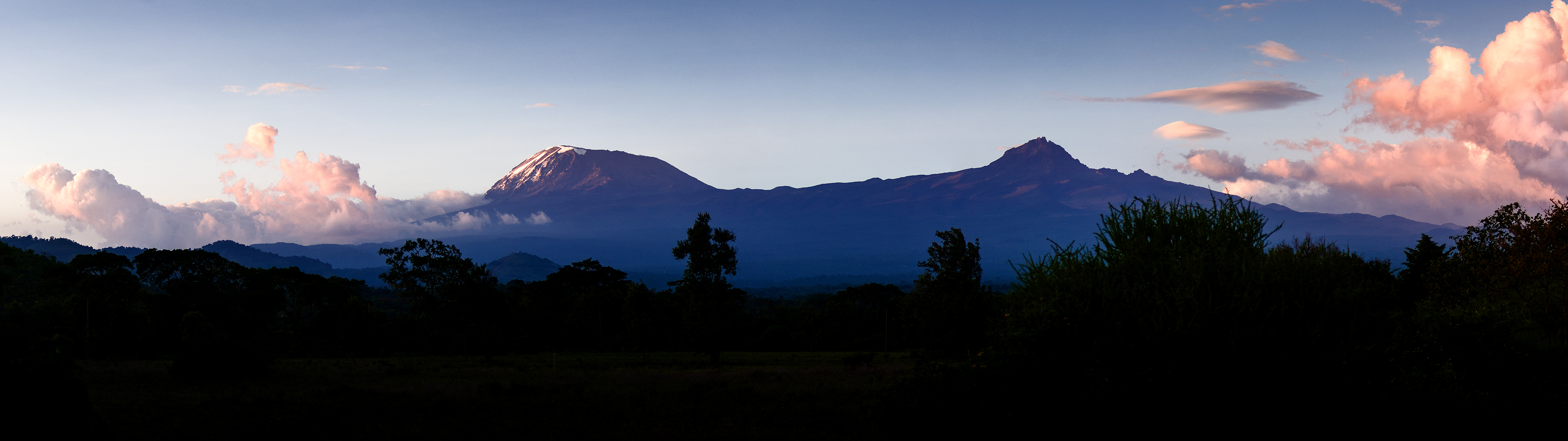
Kilimanjaro's main peaks are Kibo (left) and Mawenzi (right), as named by the Chagga. They respectively mean "spotted" and "broken".

== Geology and geography ==
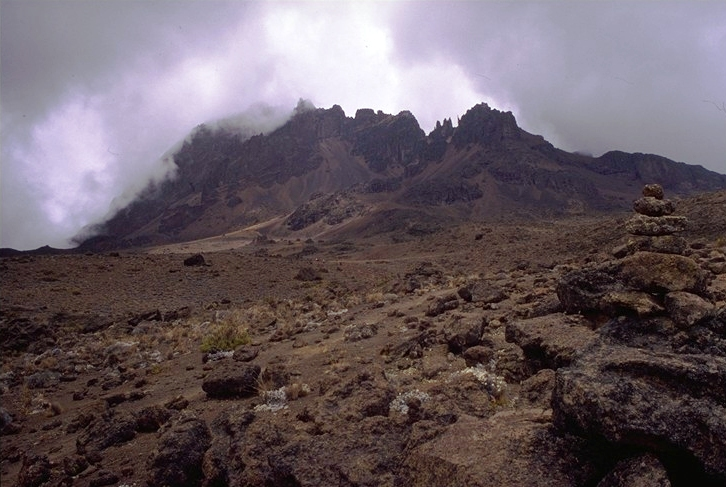
The two highest volcanic cones: Kibo (top) and Mawenzi (bottom)

Kilimanjaro is a large dormant stratovolcano composed of three distinct volcanic cones: Kibo, the highest; Mawenzi at 5,149 m (16,893 ft); and Shira, the lowest at 4,005 m (13,140 ft). Mawenzi and Shira are extinct, while Kibo is dormant and could erupt again.

Uhuru Peak is the highest summit on Kibo's crater rim. The Tanzania National Parks Authority, a Tanzanian government agency, and the United Nations Educational, Scientific and Cultural Organization both list the height of Uhuru Peak as 5,895 m (19,341 ft), based on a British survey in 1952. The height has since been measured as 5,892 m (19,331 ft) in 1999, 5,902 m (19,364 ft) in 2008, and 5,899 m (19,354 ft) in 2014.

A map of the Kibo cone on Mount Kilimanjaro was published by the British government's Directorate of Overseas Surveys (DOS) in 1964 based on aerial photography conducted in 1962 as the "Subset of Kilimanjaro, East Africa (Tanganyika) Series Y742, Sheet 56/2, D.O.S. 422 1964, Edition 1, Scale 1:50,000". Tourist mapping was first published by the Ordnance Survey in England in 1988 based on the original DOS mapping at a scale of 1:100,000, with 100 ft (30 m) contour intervals, as DOS 522. West Col Productions produced a map with tourist information in 1990, at a scale of 1:75,000, with 100 m (330 ft) contour intervals; it included inset maps of Kibo and Mawenzi on 1:20,000 and 1:30,000 scales respectively and with 50 m (160 ft) contour intervals. In recent years, numerous other maps have become available, of various qualities.

=== Volcanology ===
The volcanic interior of Kilimanjaro is poorly known because there has not been any significant erosion to expose the igneous strata that comprise the volcano's structure.

Eruptive activity at the Shira center commenced about 2.4 million years ago, with the last important phase occurring about 1.9 million years ago, just before the northern part of the edifice collapsed. Shira is topped by a broad high plain at 3,800 m (12,500 ft), which may be a filled caldera. The remnant caldera rim has been degraded deeply by erosion. Before the caldera formed and erosion began, Shira might have been between 4,900 and 5,200 m (16,100 and 17,100 ft) high. It is mostly composed of basaltic lavas, with some pyroclastics. The formation of the caldera was accompanied by lava emanating from ring fractures, but there was no large-scale explosive activity. Two cones formed subsequently, the phonolitic one at the northwest end of the ridge and the doleritic Platzkegel in the caldera center.

Both Mawenzi and Kibo began erupting about 1 million years ago. They are separated by the Saddle Plateau at 4,400 m (14,400 ft) elevation.

The youngest dated rocks at Mawenzi are about 448,000 years old. Mawenzi forms a horseshoe-shaped ridge with pinnacles and ridges opening to the northeast, with a tower-like shape resulting from deep erosion and a mafic dike swarm. Several large cirques cut into the ring and the largest of these sits on top of the Great Barranco gorge. Also notable are the East and West Barrancos on the northeastern side of the mountain. Most of the eastern side of the mountain has been removed by erosion. Mawenzi has a subsidiary peak, Neumann Tower, 4,425 m (14,518 ft).

Kibo is the largest cone on the mountain and is more than 24 km (15 mi) wide at the Saddle Plateau altitude. The last activity here, dated to 150,000–200,000 years ago, created the current Kibo summit crater. Kibo still has gas-emitting fumaroles in its crater. Kibo is capped by an almost symmetrical cone with escarpments rising 180 to 200 m (590 to 660 ft) on the south side. These escarpments define a 2.5 km-wide (1.6-mile) caldera caused by the collapse of the summit.

Within this caldera is the Inner Cone and within the crater of the Inner Cone is the Reusch Crater, which the Tanganyika government in 1954 named after Gustav Otto Richard Reusch, upon his climbing the mountain for the 25th time (out of 65 attempts during his lifetime). The Ash Pit, 350 m (1,150 ft) deep, lies within the Reusch Crater. About 100,000 years ago, part of Kibo's crater rim collapsed, creating the area known as the Western Breach and the Great Barranco.

An almost continuous layer of lava buries most older geological features, except exposed strata within the Great West Notch and the Kibo Barranco. The former exposes intrusions of syenite. Kibo has five main lava formations:

- Phonotephrites and tephriphonolites of the Lava Tower group, on a dyke cropping out at 4,600 m (15,100 ft), dated to 482,000 years ago.
- Tephriphonolite to phonolite lavas "characterized by rhomb mega-phenocrysts of sodic feldspars" of the Rhomb Porphyry group, dated to 460,000–360,000 years ago.
- Aphyric phonolite lavas, "commonly underlain by basal obsidian horizons", of the Lent group, dated to 359,000–337,000 years ago
- Porphyritic tephriphonolite to phonolite lavas of the Caldera Rim group, dated to 274,000–170,000 years ago
- Phonolite lava flows with aegirine phenocrysts, of the Inner Crater group, which represents the last volcanic activity on Kibo

Kibo has more than 250 parasitic cones on its northwest and southeast flanks that were formed between 150,000 and 200,000 years ago and erupted picrobasalts, trachybasalts, ankaramites, and basanites. They reach as far as Lake Chala and Taveta in the southeast and the Lengurumani Plain in the northwest. Most of these cones are well preserved, except the Saddle Plateau cones which were heavily affected by glacial action. Despite their mostly small size, lava from the cones has obscured large portions of the mountain. The Saddle Plateau cones are mostly cinder cones with terminal effusion of lava, while the Upper Rombo Zone cones mostly generated lava flows. All Saddle Plateau cones predate the last glaciation.

According to reports gathered in the 19th century from the Maasai, Lake Chala on Kibo's eastern flank was the site of a village that was destroyed by an eruption.

=== Glaciers ===
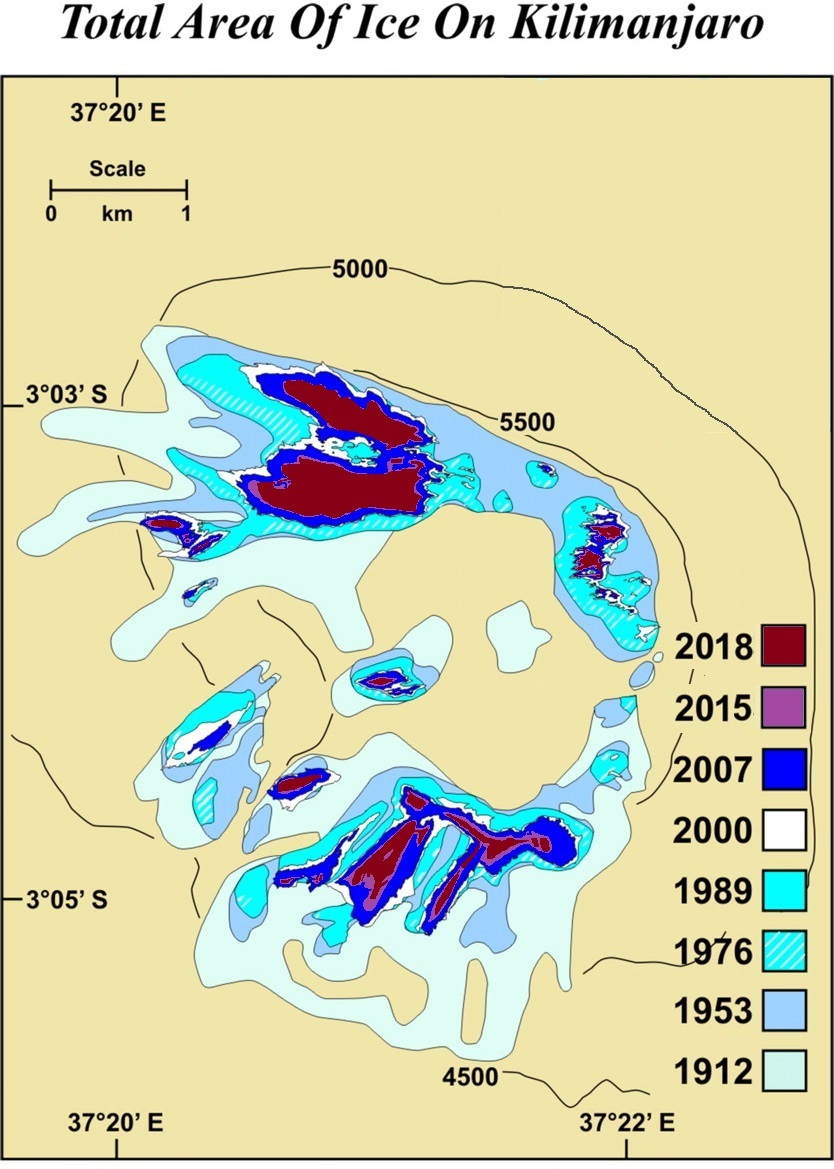
Kilimanjaro's glaciers' retreat in 1912–2018

Kibo's ice cap exists because Kilimanjaro is a little-dissected, massive mountain that rises above the snow line. The cap is divergent and at the edges splits into individual glaciers. The central portion of the ice cap is interrupted by the presence of the Kibo crater. The summit glaciers and ice fields do not display significant horizontal movements because their low thickness precludes major deformation.

Geological evidence shows five successive glacial episodes during the Quaternary period, namely First (500,000 BP), Second (greater than 360,000 years ago to 240,000 BP), Third (150,000 to 120,000 BP), Fourth (also known as "Main") (20,000 to 17,000 BP), and Little (16,000 to 14,000 BP). The Third may have been the most extensive, and the Little appears to be statistically indistinguishable from the Fourth.

A continuous ice cap covering approximately 400 km^{2} (150 mi^{2}) down to an elevation of 3,200 m (10,500 ft) covered Kilimanjaro during the Last Glacial Maximum in the Pleistocene epoch (the Main glacial episode), extending across the summits of Kibo and Mawenzi. Because of the exceptionally prolonged dry conditions during the subsequent Younger Dryas stadial, the ice fields on Kilimanjaro may have become extinct around 11,500 years BP. Ice cores taken from Kilimanjaro's Northern Ice Field (NIF) indicates that the glaciers there have a basal age of about 11,700 years, although an analysis of ice taken in 2011 from exposed vertical cliffs in the NIF supports an age extending only to 800 years BP. Higher precipitation rates at the beginning of the Holocene epoch (11,500 years BP) allowed the ice cap to reform. The glaciers survived a widespread drought during a three century period beginning around 4,000 years BP.

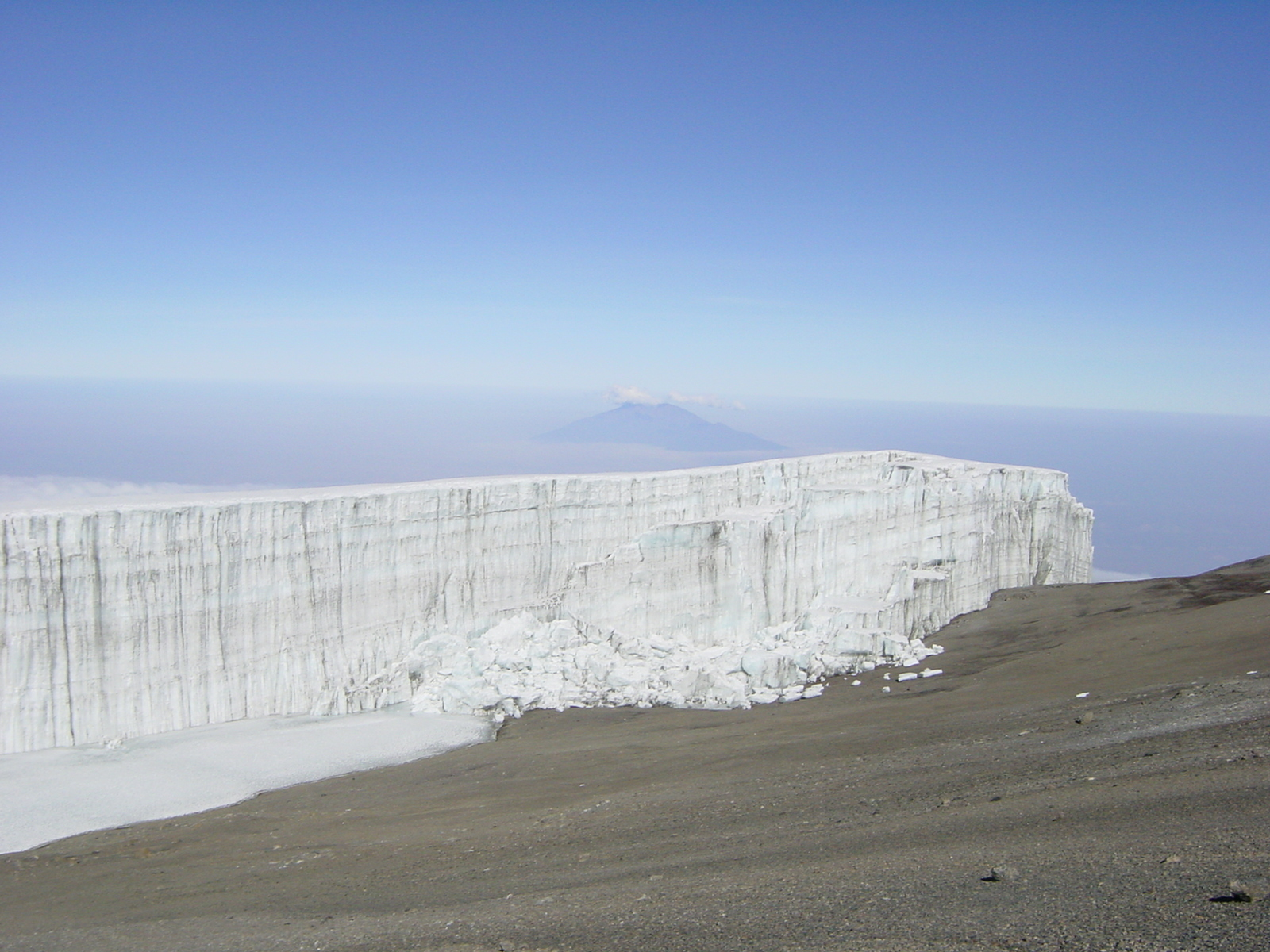
Vertical margin wall of the Rebmann Glacier in 2005 with Mount Meru, which is 70 km (43 mi) away, in the background

In the late 1880s, the summit of Kibo was completely covered by an ice cap about 20 km^{2} (7.7 mi^{2}) in extent with outlet glaciers cascading down the western and southern slopes, and except for the inner cone, the entire caldera was buried. Glacier ice also flowed through the Western Breach. The slope glaciers retreated rapidly between 1912 and 1953, in response to a sudden shift in climate at the end of the 19th century that made them "drastically out of equilibrium", and more slowly thereafter. Their continuing demise indicates they are still out of equilibrium in response to a constant change in climate over the past century.

In contrast to the persistent slope glaciers, the glaciers on Kilimanjaro's crater plateau have appeared and disappeared repeatedly during the Holocene epoch, with each cycle lasting a few hundred years. It appears that decreasing specific humidity instead of temperature changes has caused shrinkage of the slope glaciers since the late 19th century. No clear warming trend at the elevation of those glaciers occurred between 1948 and 2005. Although air temperatures at that elevation are always below freezing, solar radiation causes melting on vertical faces. Vertical ice margin walls are a unique characteristic of the summit glaciers and a major place of the shrinkage of the glaciers. They manifest stratifications, calving, and other ice features. "There is no pathway for the plateau glaciers other than to continuously retreat once their vertical margins are exposed to solar radiation." The Kilimanjaro glaciers have been used for deriving ice core records, including two from the southern icefield. Based on this data, this icefield formed between 1,250 and 1,450 years BP.

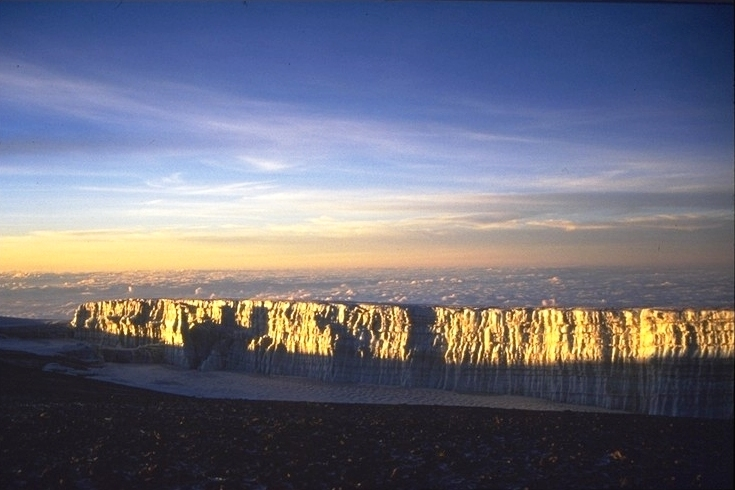
A vertical glacier margin wall as seen from Gilman's Point on the crater rim at sunrise in 1998

Almost 85 percent of the ice cover on Kilimanjaro disappeared between October 1912 and June 2011, with coverage decreasing from 11.40 km^{2} (4.40 mi^{2}) to <1 km^{2} (0.39 mi^{2}) Between 1912 and 1953, there was about a 1.1 percent average annual loss of ice coverage. The average annual loss for 1953 to 1989 was 1.4 percent, while the loss rate for 1989 to 2007 was 2.5 percent. Of the ice cover still present in 2000, almost 40 percent had disappeared by 2011. Ice climber Will Gadd noticed differences between his 2014 and 2020 climbs. The glaciers are thinning in addition to losing areal coverage, and do not have active accumulation zones; retreat occurs on all glacier surfaces. Loss of glacier mass is caused by both melting and sublimation. While the current shrinking and thinning of Kilimanjaro's ice fields appear to be unique within its almost twelve-millennium history, it is contemporaneous with widespread glacier retreat in mid-to-low latitudes across the globe. In 2013, it was estimated that, at the current rate of global warming, most of the ice on Kilimanjaro will disappear by 2040, and "it is highly unlikely that any ice body will remain after 2060".

The Furtwangler Glacier on Kilimanjaro is a remnant of the ice cap that once covered the mountain. This has retreated dramatically over the last century with over 80 percent glacial retreat. The glacier is named after Walter Furtwangler, who along with Ziegfried Koenig, was the fourth to ascend to the summit of Kilimanjaro in 1912.

A complete disappearance of the ice would be of only "negligible importance" to the water budget of the area around the mountain. The forests of Kilimanjaro, far below the ice fields, "are [the] essential water reservoirs for the local and regional populations".

=== Drainage ===
Kilimanjaro is drained by a network of rivers and streams, especially on the wetter and more heavily eroded southern side and primarily above 1,200 m (3,900 ft). Below that altitude, increased evaporation and human water usage reduce the water flows. The Lumi and Pangani rivers drain Kilimanjaro on the eastern and southern sides, respectively.

=== IUGS geological heritage site ===
In respect of it being 'the highest stratovolcano of the East African Rift that maintains a glacier on its summit', the International Union of Geological Sciences (IUGS) included 'The Pleistocene Kilimanjaro volcano' in its assemblage of 100 'geological heritage sites' around the world in a listing published in October 2022. The organization defines an IUGS Geological Heritage Site as 'a key place with geological elements and/or processes of international scientific relevance, used as a reference, and/or with a substantial contribution to the development of geological sciences through history.'

== Human history ==
=== Chagga states ===
Kilimanjaro is attested to in numerous stories by the people who live in East Africa. The Chagga, who traditionally lived on the southern and eastern slopes of the mountain in sovereign Chagga states, tell how a man named Tone once provoked a god, Ruwa, to bring famine upon the land. The people became angry at Tone, forcing him to flee. Nobody wanted to protect him but a solitary dweller who had stones that turned miraculously into cattle. The dweller bid that Tone never open the stable of the cattle. When Tone did not heed the warning and the cattle escaped, Tone followed them, but the fleeing cattle threw up hills to run on, including Mawenzi and Kibo. Tone finally collapsed on Kibo, ending the pursuit.

Another Chagga legend tells of ivory-filled graves of elephants on the mountain, and of a cow named Rayli that produces miraculous fat from her tail glands. If a man tries to steal such a gland but is too slow in his moves, Rayli will blast a powerful snort and blow the thief down onto the plain.

=== Early records ===
The mountain may have been known to non-Africans since antiquity. Sailors' reports recorded by Ptolemy mention a "moon mountain" and a spring lake of the Nile, which may indicate Kilimanjaro, although available historical information does not allow differentiation among others in East Africa like Mount Kenya, the mountains of Ethiopia, the Virunga Mountains, the Rwenzori Mountains, and Kilimanjaro. Before Ptolemy, Aeschylus and Herodotus referred to "Egypt nurtured by the snows" and to a spring between two mountains, respectively. One of these mentions two tall mountains in the coastal regions with a valley with traces of fire between them. Martín Fernández de Enciso, a Spanish traveler to Mombasa who obtained information about the interior from native caravans, said in his Summa de Geografía (1519) that west of Mombasa "stands the Ethiopian Mount Olympus, which is exceedingly high, and beyond it are the Mountains of the Moon, in which are the sources of the Nile".

=== European exploration ===
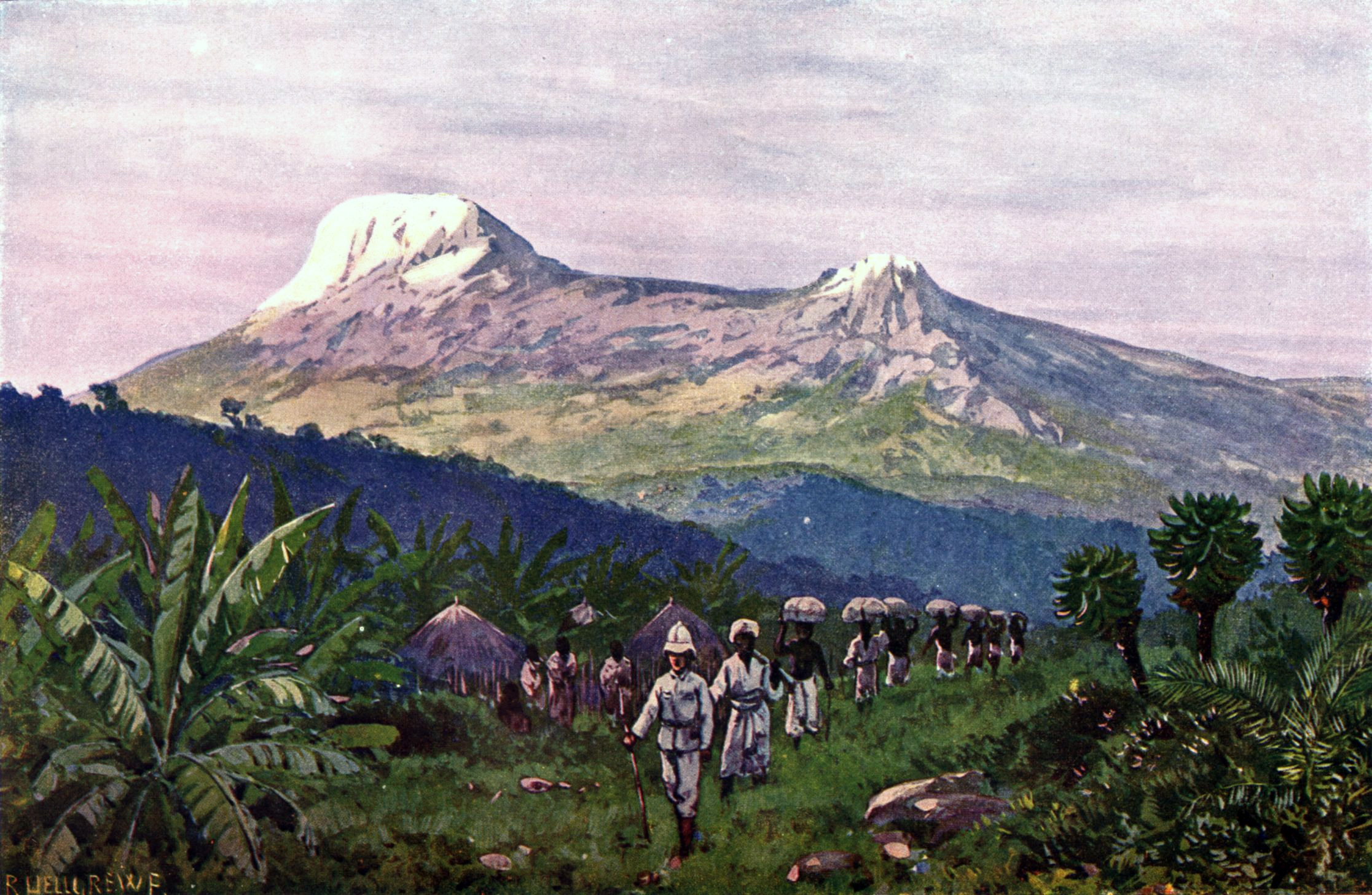
A German illustration of Kilimanjaro in 1911

The German missionaries Johannes Rebmann of Mombasa and Johann Krapf were the first Europeans known to have attempted to reach the mountain. According to English geographer Halford Mackinder and English explorer Harry Johnston, Rebmann in 1848 was the first European to report the existence of Kilimanjaro. Hans Meyer has claimed that Rebmann first arrived in Africa in 1846 and quotes Rebmann's diary entry of 11 May 1848 as saying,

This morning, at 10 o'clock, we obtained a clearer view of the mountains of Jagga, the summit of one of which was covered by what looked like a beautiful white cloud. When I inquired as to the dazzling whiteness, the guide merely called it 'cold' and at once I knew it could be neither more nor less than snow.... Immediately I understood how to interpret the marvelous tales Dr. Krapf and I had heard at the coast, of a vast mountain of gold and silver in the far interior, the approach to which was guarded by evil spirits.

In August 1861, the Prussian officer Baron Karl Klaus von der Decken accompanied by English geologist Richard Thornton attempted to climb Kibo but "got no farther than 2,500 m (8,200 ft) owing to the inclemency of the weather". In December 1862, von der Decken tried a second time together with Otto Kersten, reaching a height of 4,300 m (14,000 ft).

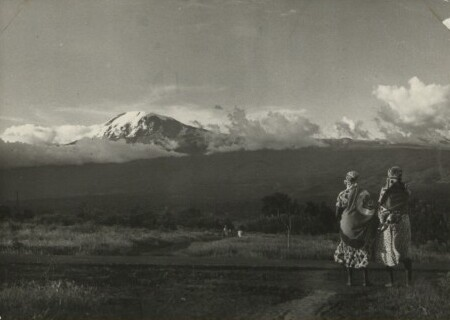
From the UK National Archives

In August 1871, missionary Charles New became the "first European to reach the equatorial snows" on Kilimanjaro at an elevation of slightly more than 4,000 m (13,000 ft). In June 1887, the Hungarian Count Sámuel Teleki and the Austrian Lieutenant Ludwig von Höhnel made an attempt to climb the mountain. Approaching from the saddle between Mawenzi and Kibo, Höhnel stopped at 4,950 m (16,240 ft), but Teleki continued until he reached the snow at 5,300 m (17,400 ft). Later in 1887, the German geology professor Hans Meyer reached the lower edge of the ice cap on Kibo, where he was forced to turn back because he lacked the equipment needed to progress across the ice. The following year, Meyer planned another attempt with Oscar Baumann, a cartographer, but the mission was aborted after the pair were held hostage and ransomed during the Abushiri Revolt. In the autumn of 1888, the American naturalist Abbott and the German explorer Otto Ehrenfried Ehlers approached the summit from the northwest. While Abbott turned back earlier, Ehlers at first claimed to have reached the summit rim, but after severe criticism of the claim, withdrew it.

In 1889, Meyer returned to Kilimanjaro with the Austrian mountaineer Ludwig Purtscheller for a third attempt. This attempt was based on the establishment of several campsites with food supplies so that multiple attempts at the top could be made without having to descend too far. Meyer and Purtscheller pushed to near the crater rim on 3 October but turned back exhausted from hacking footsteps in the icy slope. Three days later, they reached the highest summit, on the southern rim of the crater. They were the first to confirm that Kibo has a crater. After descending to the saddle between Kibo and Mawenzi, Meyer and Purtscheller attempted to climb the more technically challenging Mawenzi but could only reach the top of Klute Peak, a subsidiary peak, before retreating due to illness. On 18 October, they reascended Kibo to enter and study the crater, cresting the rim at Hans Meyers Notch. In total, Meyer and Purtscheller spent 16 days above 4,600 m (15,000 ft) during their expedition. They were accompanied in their high camps by Mwini Amani of Pangani, who cooked and supplied the sites with water and firewood.

==== First women climbers ====
In 1909, London-born Gertrude Benham attempted to reach the summit of Mount Kilimanjaro. After her porters abandoned the expedition upon discovering the skeletons of previous climbers, Benham continued alone and reached the edge of Kibo Crater, later named Gilman's Point. Adverse weather conditions, including heavy snow and fog, made navigation difficult, leading her to turn back. The first woman to successfully reach the summit of Kilimanjaro was Sheila MacDonald, who completed the ascent on 30 September 1927.

=== Modern ===
"We will light a candle on top of Mount Kilimanjaro which will shine beyond our borders, giving hope where there is despair, love where there is hate, and dignity where before there was only humiliation."

— Julius Nyerere, first president of Tanganyika and Tanzania

The first ascent of the highest summit of Mawenzi was made on 29 July 1912, by the German climbers Eduard Hans Oehler and Fritz Klute, who named it Hans Meyer Peak. Oehler and Klute went on to make the third-ever ascent of Kibo, via the Drygalski Glacier, and descended via the Western Breach. The mountain lent its name to the 1914 Battle of Kilimanjaro during World War I.

In 1989, the organizing committee of the 100-year celebration of the first ascent decided to award posthumous certificates to the African porter-guides who had accompanied Meyer and Purtscheller. One person in pictures or documents of the 1889 expedition was thought to match a living inhabitant of Marangu, Yohani Kinyala Lauwo. Lauwo did not know his own age, nor remember Meyer or Purtscheller. He did recall joining a Kilimanjaro expedition involving a Dutch doctor who lived near the mountain, and that he did not wear shoes during the climb. Lauwo claimed that he had climbed the mountain three times before the beginning of World War I. The committee concluded that he had been a member of Meyer's team and therefore must have been born around 1871. Lauwo died on 10 May 1996, 107 years after the first ascent. It is sometimes suggested that he was a co-first-ascendant of Kilimanjaro.

== Fauna and flora ==
=== Animals ===
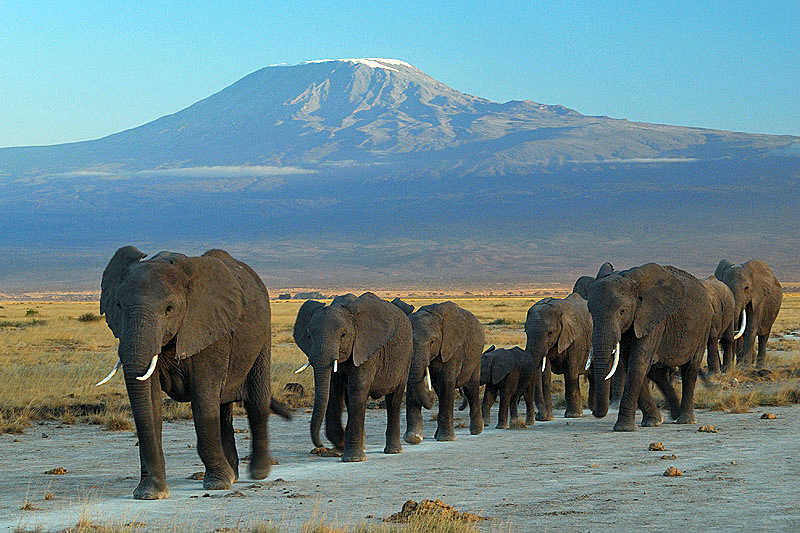
Elephants at Amboseli National Park against Mount Kilimanjaro

Large animals are rare on Kilimanjaro and are more frequent in the forests and lower parts of the mountain. Elephants and Cape buffaloes are among the animals that can be potentially hazardous to trekkers. Bushbucks, chameleons, dik-diks, duikers, mongooses, sunbirds, and warthogs have also been reported. Zebras, leopards and hyenas have been observed sporadically on the Shira plateau. Specific species associated with the mountain include the Kilimanjaro shrew and the chameleon Kinyongia tavetana.

=== Vegetation ===
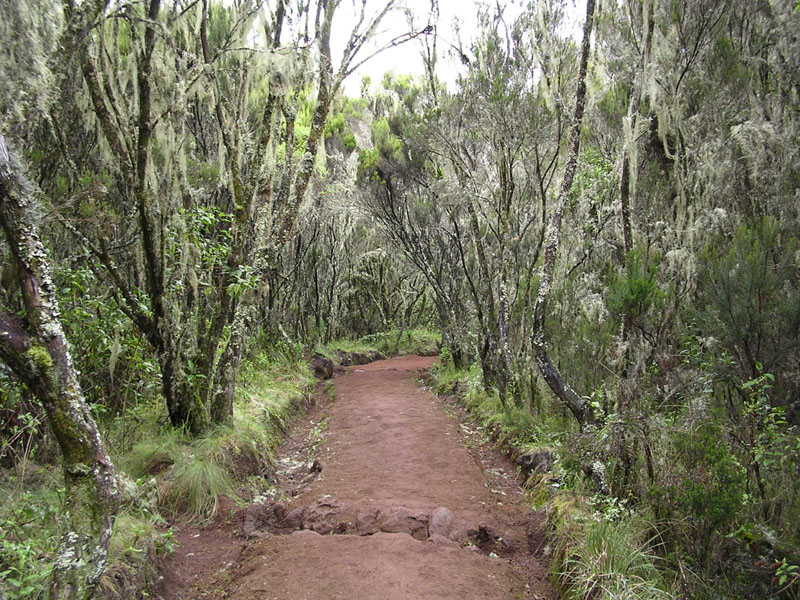
The cloud forest on the Marangu route on the south eastern slope

Natural forests cover about 1,000 km^{2} (250,000 acres) on Kilimanjaro. In the foothill area, maize, beans, sunflowers and, on the western side, wheat are cultivated. There are remnants of the former savanna vegetation with Acacia, Combretum, Terminalia and Grewia. Between 1,000 m (3,300 ft) and 1,800 m (5,900 ft), coffee appears as part of the "Chagga home gardens" agroforestry. Native vegetation at this altitude range (Strombosia, Newtonia, and Entandrophragma) is limited to inaccessible valleys and gorges and is different from vegetation at higher altitudes. On the southern slope, montane forests first contain Ocotea usambarensis as well as ferns and epiphytes; farther up in cloud forests Podocarpus latifolius, Hagenia abyssinica and Erica excelsa grow, as well as fog-dependent mosses. On the drier northern slopes olive, Croton-Calodendrum, Cassipourea, and Juniperus form forests in order of increasing altitude. Between 3,100 m (10,200 ft) and 3,900 m (12,800 ft) lie Erica bush and heathlands, followed by Helichrysum, until 4,500 m (14,800 ft). Neophytes have been observed, including Poa annua.

The lower northern and western slopes are dominated by Acacia savanna, while most of the wooded grassland of the lower southern and eastern slopes have been destroyed for cultivation.

Records from the Maundi crater at 2,780 m (9,120 ft) indicate that the vegetation of Kilimanjaro has varied over time. Forest vegetation retreated during the Last Glacial Maximum and the ericaceous vegetation belt lowered by 1,500 m (4,900 ft) between 42,000 and 30,000 years ago because of the drier and colder conditions.

The Tussock Grassland is an area on the slopes of Mount Kilimanjaro that contains many unique species of vegetation, such as the water holding cabbage.

== Conservation ==
Since 1973, Mount Kilimanjaro has been designated as a national park, prohibiting human activities within its boundaries to preserve its ecosystem. The government has also implemented a ban on tree harvesting to prevent environmental degradation and protect the park's biodiversity.

== Climate ==
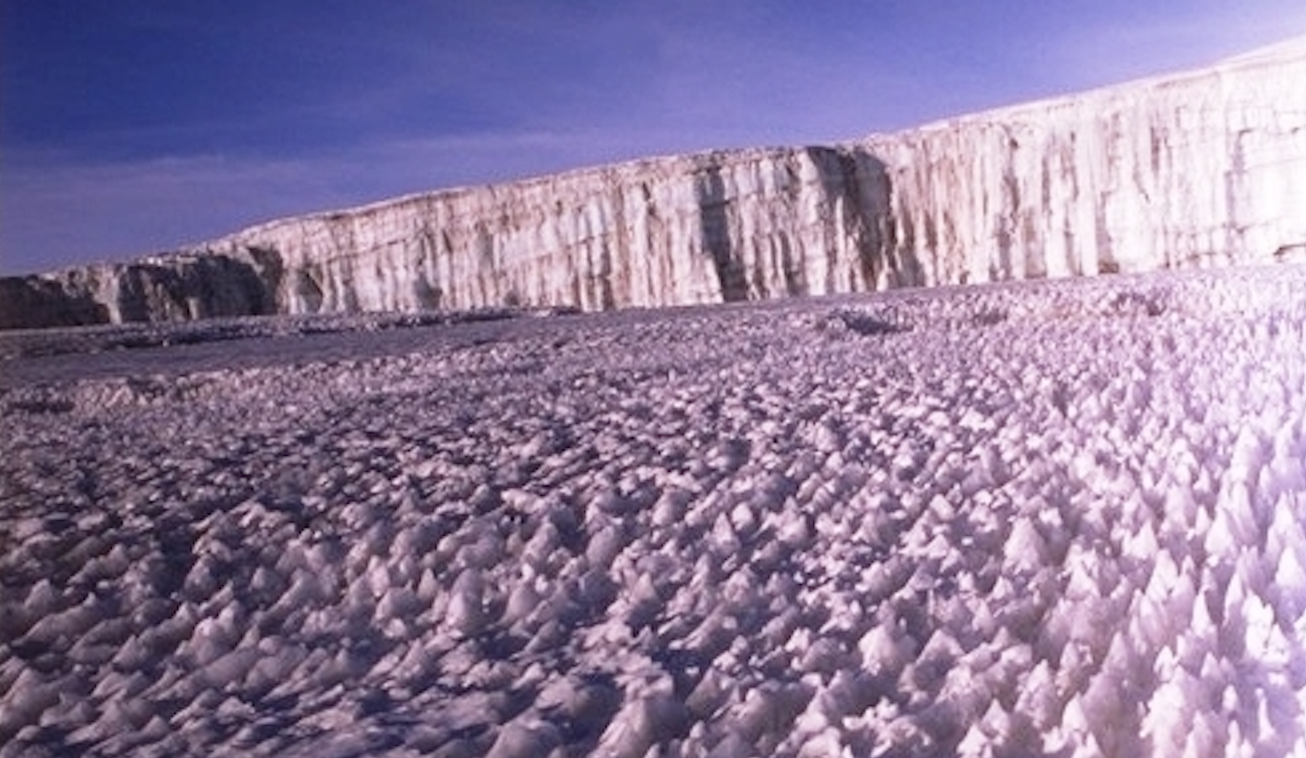
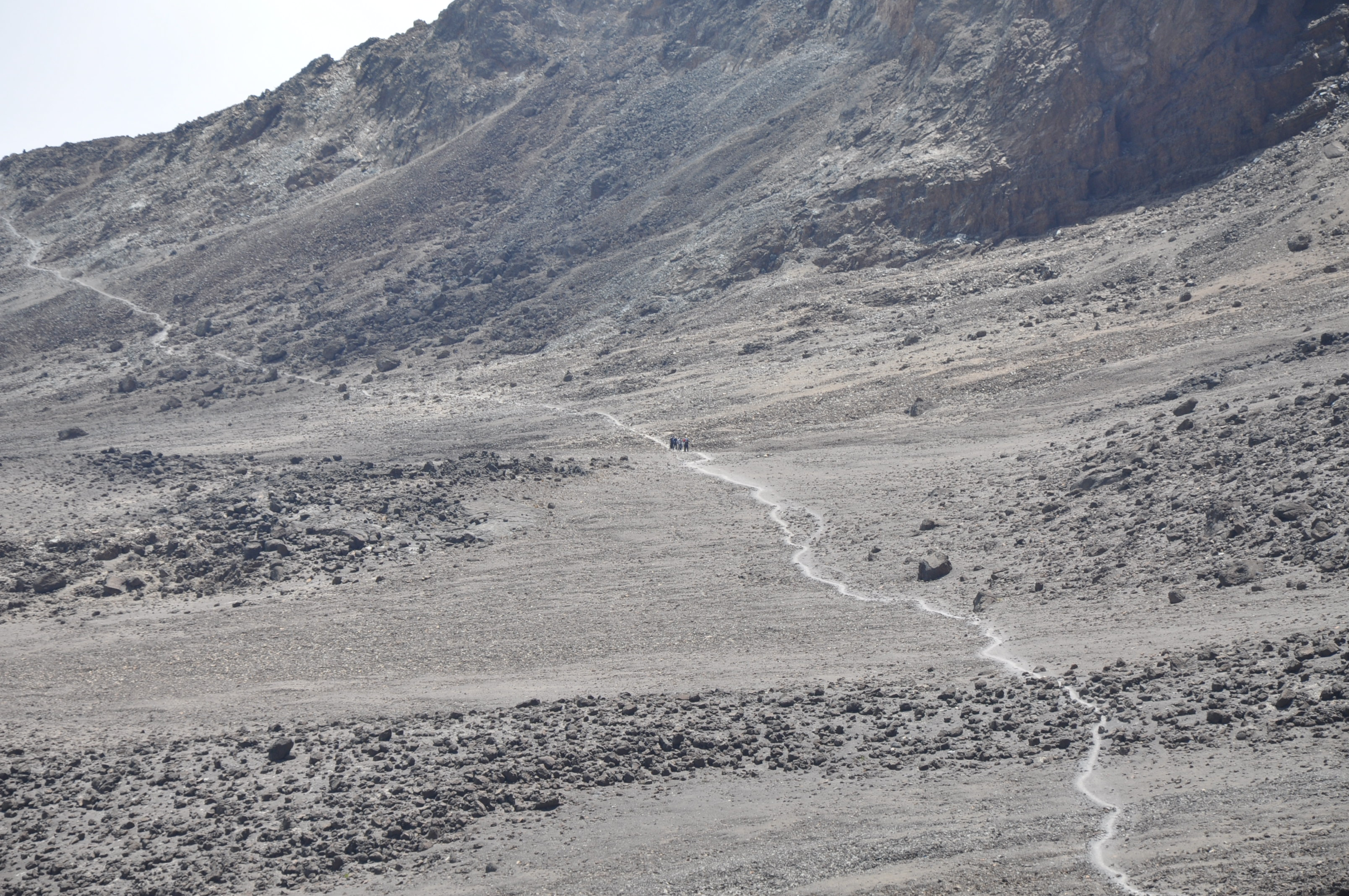
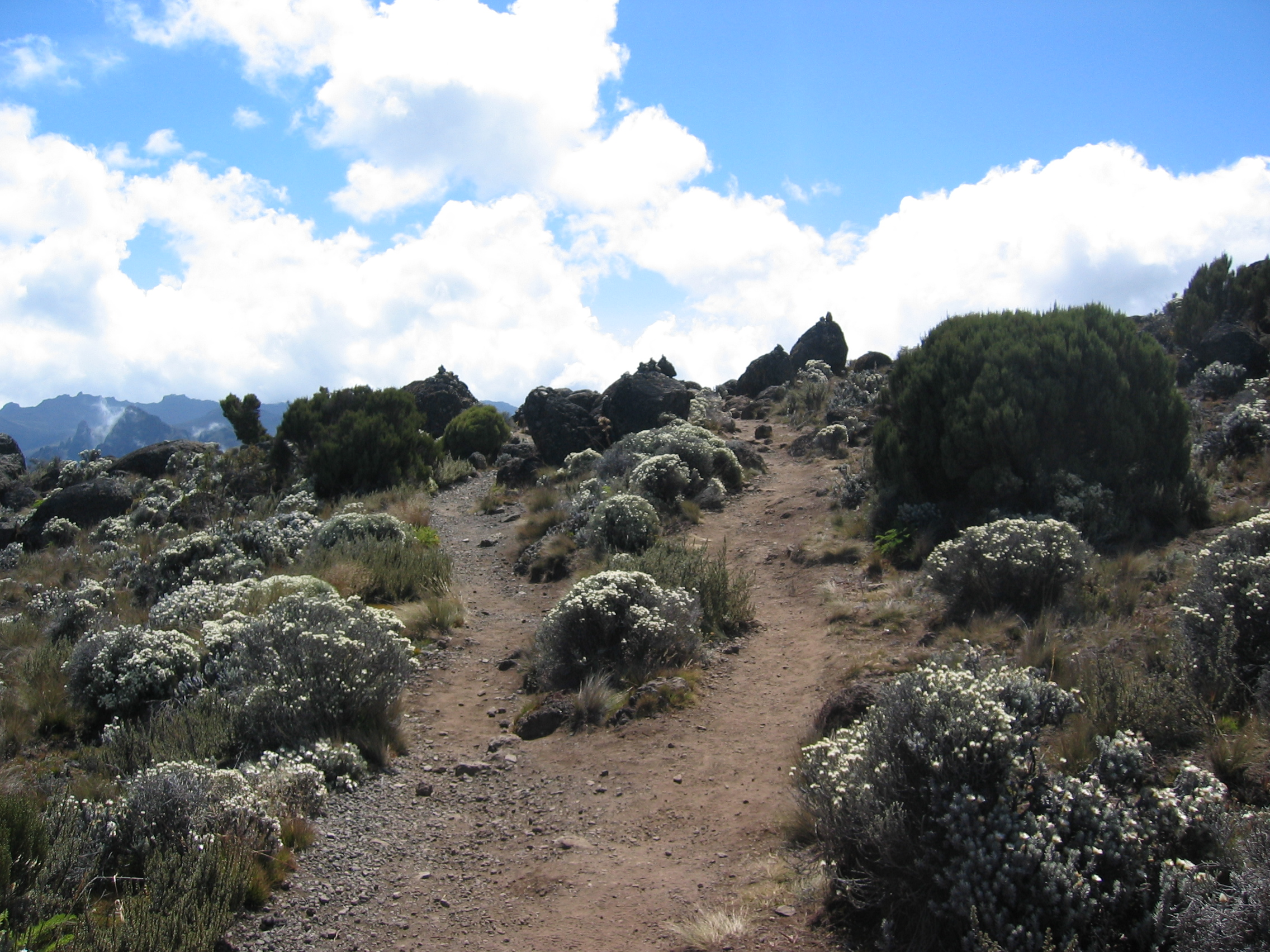
Mount Kilimanjaro's slopes include arctic (top), dry alpine desert (middle), and moorland (bottom) climactic zones.

The climate of Kilimanjaro is influenced by the height of the mountain, which allows the simultaneous influence of the equatorial trade winds and the high altitude anti-trades, and by the isolated position of the mountain. Kilimanjaro has daily upslope and nightly downslope winds, a regimen stronger on the southern than the northern side of the mountain. The flatter southern flanks are more extended and affect the atmosphere more strongly.

Kilimanjaro has two distinct rainy seasons, one from March to May and another around November. The northern slopes receive much less rainfall than the southern ones. The lower southern slope receives 800 to 900 mm (31 to 35 in) annually, rising to 1,500 to 2,000 mm (59 to 79 in) at 1,500 m (4,900 ft) altitude and peaking "partly over" 3,000 mm (120 in) in the forest belt at 2,000 to 2,300 m (6,600 to 7,500 ft). In the alpine zone, annual precipitation decreases to 200 mm (7.9 in).

The average temperature in the summit area is approximately −7 °C (19 °F). Nighttime surface temperatures on the Northern Ice Field (NIF) fall on average to −9 °C (16 °F), with an average daytime high of −4 °C (25 °F). During nights of extreme radiational cooling, the NIF can cool to as low as −15 to −27 °C (5 to −17 °F).

Snowfall can occur at any time of year but is mostly associated with northern Tanzania's two rainy seasons. Precipitation in the summit area occurs principally as snow and graupel of 250 to 500 mm (9.8 to 19.7 in) per year and ablates within days or years.

The climate is classified as an ice-cap climate (Köppen: EF), with little seasonal temperature variations and relatively mild temperatures due to its proximity to the equator.

Climate data for Machame 10, Kilimanjaro, Tanzania (5,803 m) (2012–2015)
Month	Jan	Feb	Mar	Apr	May	Jun	Jul	Aug	Sep	Oct	Nov	Dec	Year
Record high °C (°F)	5.6 (42.1)	6.2 (43.2)	4.0 (39.2)	3.7 (38.7)	5.3 (41.5)	6.5 (43.7)	4.5 (40.1)	2.9 (37.2)	4.7 (40.5)	4.8 (40.6)	4.6 (40.3)	5.8 (42.4)	6.5 (43.7)
Mean daily maximum °C (°F)	−0.6 (30.9)	−1.2 (29.8)	−1.2 (29.8)	−0.4 (31.3)	−0.2 (31.6)	−1.8 (28.8)	−2.3 (27.9)	−2.2 (28.0)	−2.2 (28.0)	−1.5 (29.3)	−0.9 (30.4)	−0.5 (31.1)	−1.3 (29.7)
Daily mean °C (°F)	−5.7 (21.7)	−6.0 (21.2)	−5.7 (21.7)	−5.4 (22.3)	−5.4 (22.3)	−6.4 (20.5)	−6.4 (20.5)	−6.4 (20.5)	−6.5 (20.3)	−6.1 (21.0)	−5.6 (21.9)	−5.5 (22.1)	−5.9 (21.3)
Mean daily minimum °C (°F)	−9.4 (15.1)	−9.4 (15.1)	−8.9 (16.0)	−8.5 (16.7)	−8.8 (16.2)	−9.8 (14.4)	−9.8 (14.4)	−9.7 (14.5)	−9.8 (14.4)	−9.4 (15.1)	−8.9 (16.0)	−8.9 (16.0)	−9.3 (15.3)
Record low °C (°F)	−12.4 (9.7)	−11.9 (10.6)	−12.3 (9.9)	−11.2 (11.8)	−11.2 (11.8)	−13.4 (7.9)	−13.1 (8.4)	−12.3 (9.9)	−12.5 (9.5)	−11.8 (10.8)	−11.2 (11.8)	−11.0 (12.2)	−13.4 (7.9)
Source: CEDA Archive

=== Climatic zones ===
- Bushland / Lower Slope:, 800 to 1,800 m (2,600 to 5,900 ft)
- Rainforest: 1,800 to 2,800 m (5,900 to 9,200 ft)
- Heather / Moorland: 2,800 to 4,000 m (9,200 to 13,100 ft)
- Alpine Desert: 4,000 to 5,000 m (13,000 to 16,000 ft)
- Arctic: 5,000 to 5,895 m (16,404 to 19,341 ft).

== Tourism industry ==
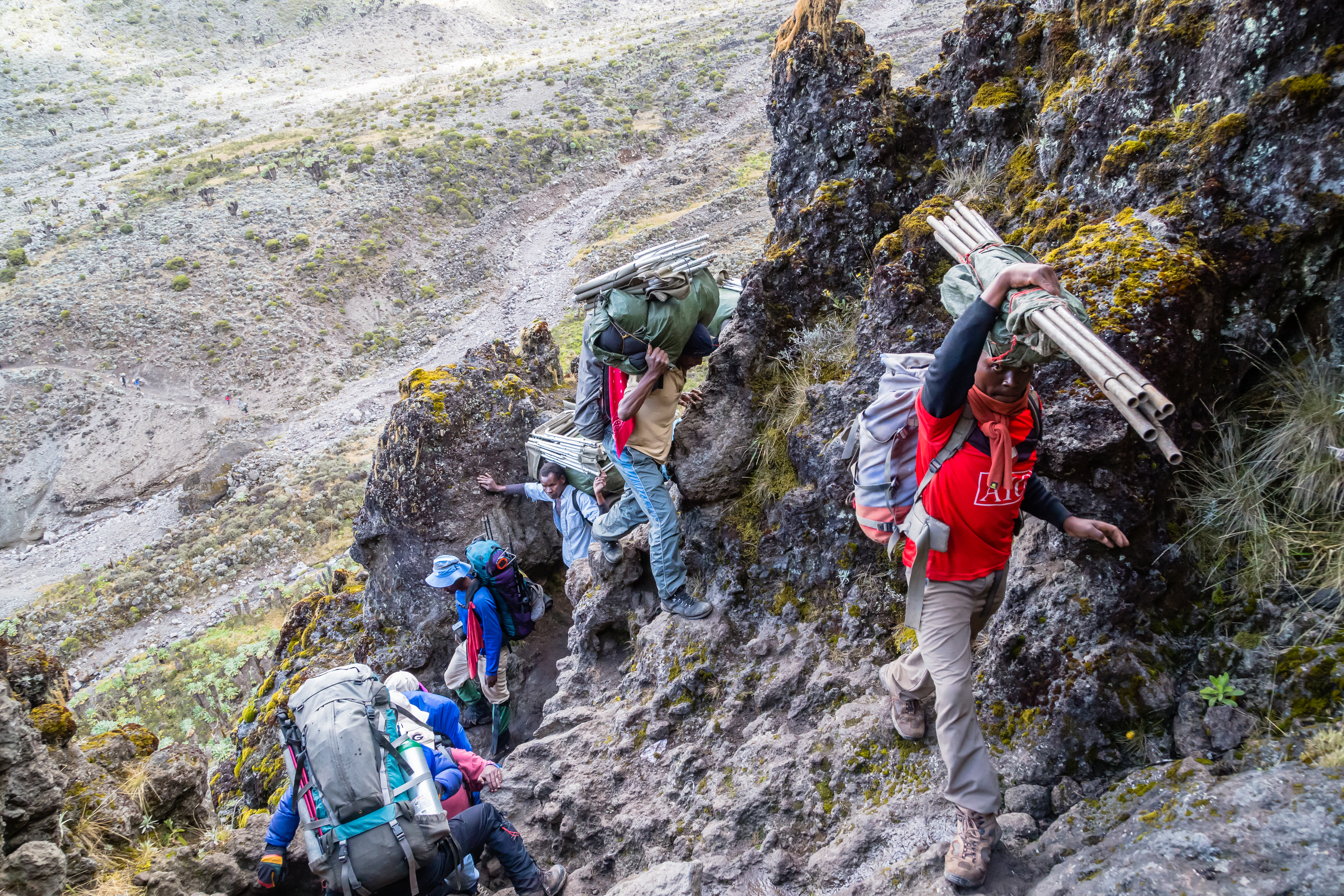
Mountain porters on Kilimanjaro

Kilimanjaro National Park generated US$51 million in revenue in 2013, the second-most of any Tanzanian national park. The Tanzania National Parks Authority reported that the park recorded 57,456 tourists during the 2011–12 budget year, of whom 16,425 hiked the mountain; the park's General Management Plan specifies an annual capacity of 28,470. The mountain hikers generated irregular and seasonal jobs for about 11,000 guides, porters, and cooks in 2007. Concerns have been raised about the poor working conditions and inadequate wages of these workers. Due to Kilimanjaro National Park's popularity as a destination, the Tanzanian government has invested in road infrastructure to improve accessibility. In Tanzania, Kilimanjaro International Airport also serves as an important transportation hub.

There are seven official trekking routes by which to ascend and descend Kilimanjaro: Lemosho, Lemosho Western-Breach, Machame, Marangu, Mweka, Rongai, Shira, and Umbwe. The Machame route can be completed in 6 to 7 days, Lemosho in 6 to 8, and the Northern Circuit routes in 7 or more days. The Lemosho Route can also be continued via the Western-Breach, submitting via the western side of the mountain. The Western Breach is more secluded and avoids the 6-hour midnight ascent to the summit (like other routes). The Rongai is the easiest of the camping routes. The Marangu is also relatively easy, if frequently busy; accommodation is in shared huts. The Lemosho Western-Breach Route commences on the western side of Kilimanjaro at Lemosho and continues to the summit via the Western-Breach Route.

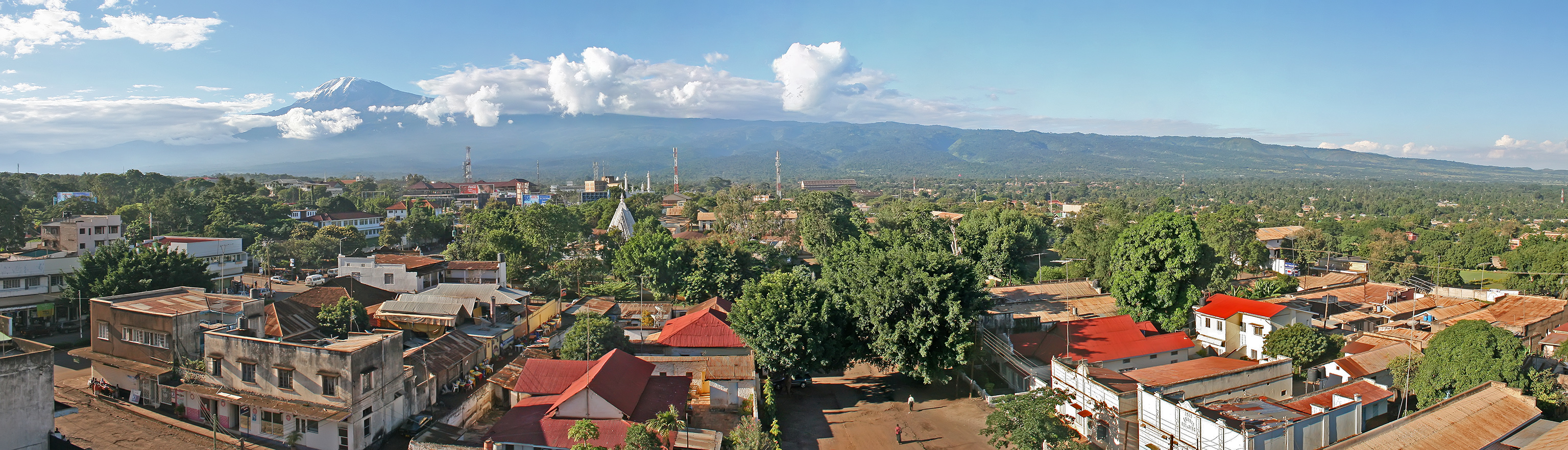
Kilimanjaro as seen from the tourist hub of Moshi in the Kilimanjaro Region

=== Trekking routes ===
Climbing routes

One of the most popular mountains in the world, Mount Kilimanjaro is visited yearly by roughly 50,000 trekkers who aspire to reach its summit, with the average summit success rate across all climbers and routes being 70-80%. However, summit success rate heavily depends upon the route, as routes vary considerably in terms of acclimatization profile and climb duration. Kilimanjaro has a number of official climbing routes. These are: Northern Circuit, Machame, Marangu, Rongai, Londorossi Lemosho, Umbwe, Shira, and Mweka (descent only).

Route	Description	Days	Length
Northern Circuit	Newest route on Kilimanjaro. Very low traffic due to very long time on the mountain, traverses nearly the entire mountain including the north side. Long route with great views.	9	90 kilometres (56 mi)
Lemosho	Long access drive, remote, less frequented forested traverse to Barafu, camping.	8 (-1)	56 kilometres (35 mi)
Machame	Second most popular route. Forested traverse to Barafu.	7 (-1)	49 kilometres (30 mi)
Marangu	Very popular (crowded). Gentle gradients and long sections up to 4700m (2.9 mi). Not a very scenic route as compared to Machame and Lemosho, comfortable but basic huts. The six-day variant provides good time for acclimatization due to a rest day at Horombo Hut.	6 (-1)	64 kilometres (40 mi)
Rongai	Long access drive, remote, less frequented, some fine, wild, least scenic, camping. Good for acclimatization.	5-6	65 kilometres (40 mi)
Umbwe	Shortest and steepest route, very physically taxing and requires serious endurance. Dangerous route.	6 (-1)	37 kilometres (23 mi)

==== Marangu Route ====
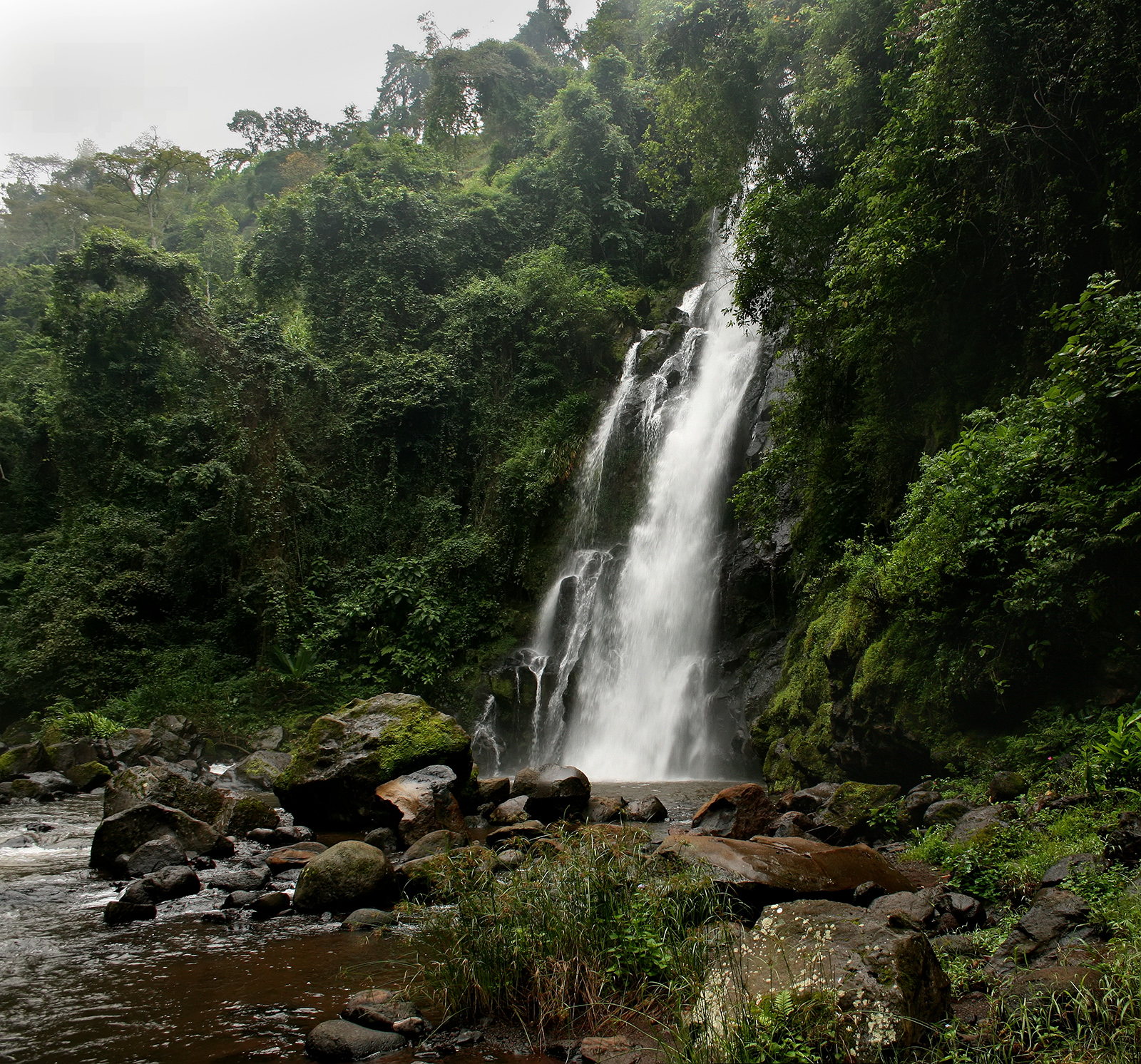
Waterfalls at Marangu.

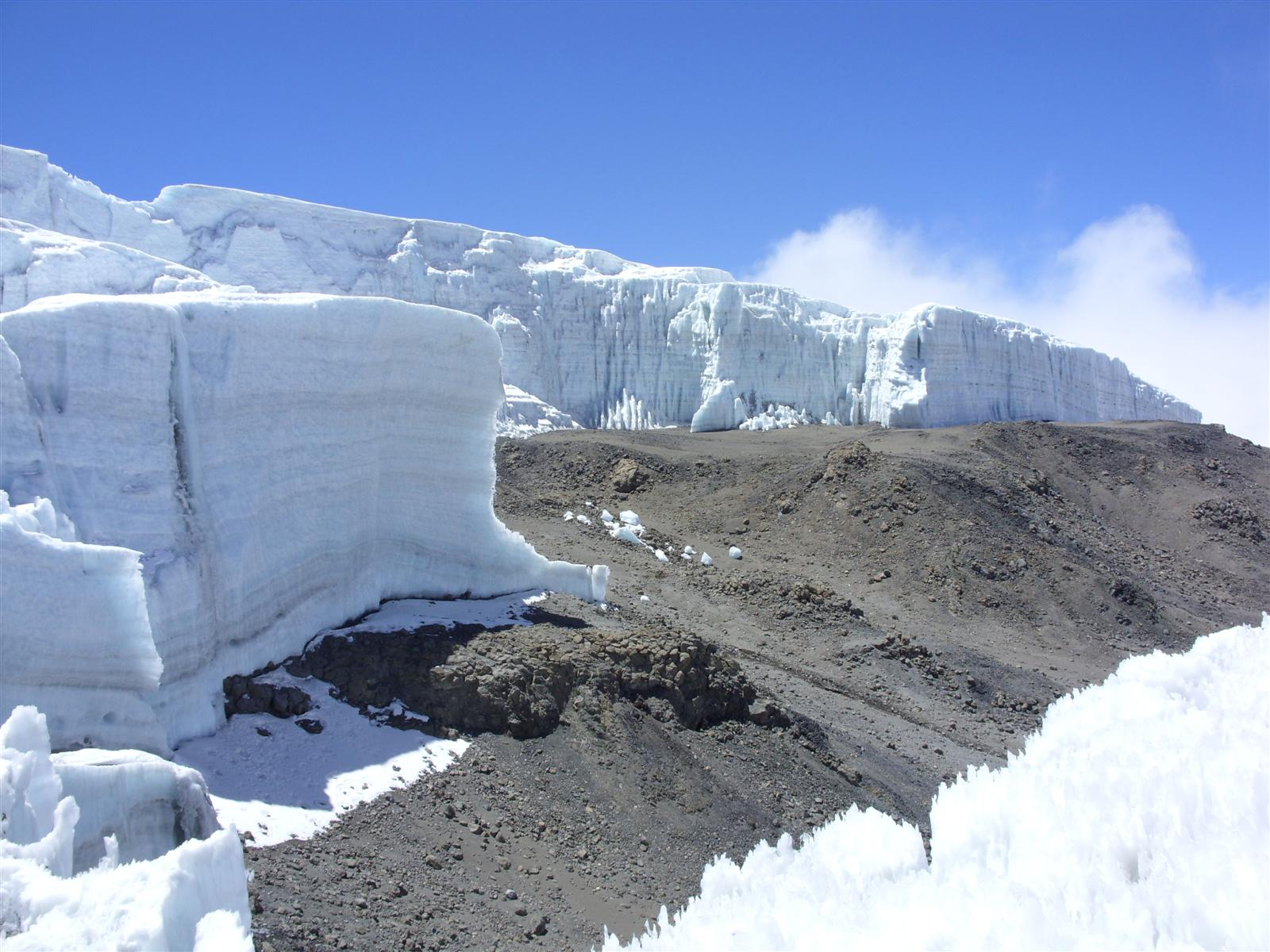
The Credner glacier.

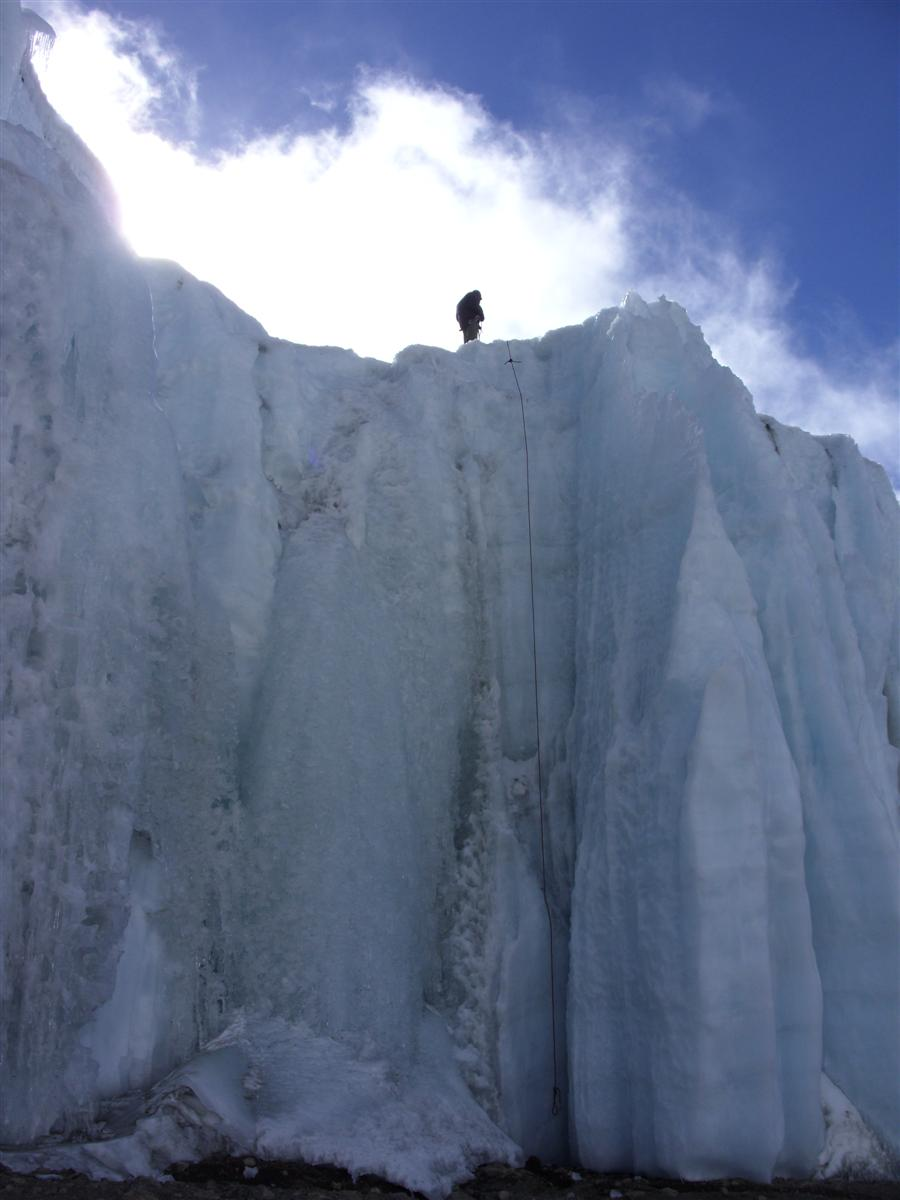
Abseiling down the Credner glacier on the way to the western breach.

The Marangu Route (also known as the "Coca-Cola" route) is the easiest ascent of Kilimanjaro. Climbs can be done over 6 days. It crosses The Saddle, a 5 kilometres (3.1 mi) wide, high-altitude, semi-desert that separates craggy Mawenzi from the main summit Kibo. From the summit, glaciers, screes, cliffs, afro-alpine moorland, and forests lead down to the cultivated foothills.

The Marangu route is popular for beginners as it is one of the shortest routes and requires no camping gear to be carried. For this reason, it is often the cheapest option. Because of its short profile, the Marangu route has the lowest summit success rate out of any route.

Trekkers sometimes spend an extra day to acclimate to the altitude at Horombo Hut. Also, trekkers often start the final ascent to Uhuru Peak early from Kibo Hut because the scree is easier to climb when frozen, and they can get a dawn view from the crater rim.

Route Outline

1. Trekkers drive to Marangu Gate and walk through the rain forest to Mandara hut (2,743 metres (8,999 ft)).
2. Thereafter, the forest is left behind and the open moor land to Horombo hut is crossed (3,760 metres (12,340 ft)).
3. A rest is then taken for an acclimatisation day at Horombo Hut. They then take a day walk to Zebra Rocks or to Mawenzi Hut, although this day is optional.
4. Trekkers then walk through moorland then alpine desert to "The Saddle" between the peaks of Mawenzi and Kibo. From here they take roughly an hour to reach Kibo hut (4,730 metres (15,520 ft)).
5. They will often wake very early for a start for the summit on a steep scree up to Gillman's Point (5,681 metres (18,638 ft)), which is on the crater rim. They then continue around the rim (which takes around two hours for able climbers) to Uhuru Peak (5,895 metres (19,341 ft)), the highest point in Africa. After having summitted the peak, they descend to Kibo Hut and then down to the thicker air and relative warmth of Horombo hut.
6. Afterwards, they then descend back to the start, to Marangu gate.

==== Mawenzi technical climbing ====
Technical climbing routes are available on the Mawenzi cone of Mount Kilimanjaro. Unlike the traditional routes to Uhuru Peak on Kibo, which are open to the general public, climbing Mawenzi requires a special permit from the Tanzania National Parks Authority. These permits are issued exclusively to experienced climbers with appropriate equipment. Climbing on Mawenzi is limited to a maximum of two climbers at a time and is restricted to daytime hours.

=== Climbing records ===
==== Oldest ====
The oldest person to climb Mount Kilimanjaro is Anne Lorimor, aged 89 years and 37 days, who reached Uhuru Peak at 3:14 p.m. local time on 18 July 2019.

The oldest man to summit is American Fred Dishelhorst, who reached the top on 19 July 2017 at the age of 88 years, 5 months, and 28 days old. Dishelhorst used supplemental oxygen on summit day.

==== Youngest ====
Despite an age limit of 10 years for a climbing permit, Keats Boyd from Los Angeles reached the summit on 21 January 2008 at the age of 7. This record was equaled by Montannah Kenney from Texas in March 2018 and again in July 2018 by Coaltan Tanner from New Mexico. Theodore Margaroli from London was the youngest to summit via the Western Breach route, the hardest but most scenic route at the age of 10 in 2019.

==== Fastest ====
The fastest ascent and the fastest round trip have been recorded by the Swiss-Ecuadorian mountain guide Karl Egloff. On 13 August 2014, after guiding a party to the summit the previous days, he ran from Umbwe Gate to the top in 4 hours and 56 minutes and returned to the Mweka Gate at 1,630 m (5,350 ft) in a total time of 6 hours, 42 minutes and 24 seconds.

The female round trip record is held by Erin Ton from the United States in a time of 8 hours, 33 minutes and 42 seconds. She also holds the fastest the ascent time with a time of 5:47:50 from Mweka Gate.

==== Climbs by disabled people ====
Several climbs by disabled people have drawn attention. Wheelchair user Bernard Goosen from South Africa scaled Kilimanjaro in 6 days in 2007. In 2012, Kyle Maynard who has no forearms or lower legs, crawled unassisted to the summit of Mount Kilimanjaro. In 2020, a team featuring two double above-knee amputees, Hari Budha Magar and Justin Oliver Davis, summited Kilimanjaro. It took them 6 days to cover the 56 km (35 mi) distance to the summit. In 2025 a documentary followed five Ukrainian soldiers—four on prosthetic limbs and Olha, a severely wounded female sniper—while ascending Mount Kilimanjaro, resulting in 75 minute film, Second Wind.

==== BASE jumping ====
On 9 February 2015, Red Bull athlete Valerii Rozov performed the first wing-suit BASE jump from the summit of Mount Kilimanjaro. He flew approximately 3 kilometres before landing on the southern slope.

=== Safety ===
The climb is not technically as challenging as the Himalayas or Andes, but the high elevation, low temperature, and occasional high winds can make Kilimanjaro a difficult trek. Acclimatization is required, and even experienced and physically fit trekkers may suffer some degree of altitude sickness. A study of people attempting to reach the summit of Kilimanjaro in July and August 2005 found that 61.3 percent succeeded and 77 percent experienced acute mountain sickness (AMS). A retrospective study of 917 persons who attempted to reach the summit via the Lemosho or Machame routes found that 70.4 percent experienced AMS, defined in this study to be headache, nausea, diarrhea, vomiting, or loss of appetite.

Kilimanjaro's summit is well above the altitude at which life-threatening high altitude pulmonary edema (HAPE) or high altitude cerebral edema (HACE), the most severe forms of AMS, can occur. These health risks are increased substantially by excessively fast climbing schedules motivated by high daily national park fees, busy holiday travel schedules, and the lack of permanent shelter on most routes. The six-day Machame route, which involves one day of "climbing high" to Lava Tower (4,630 m (15,190 ft) and "sleeping low" at Barranco Camp (3,976 m (13,044 ft)), may delay the onset of AMS but does not ultimately prevent its occurrence.

Falls on steep portions of the mountain and rock slides have killed trekkers. For this reason, the route via the Arrow Glacier was closed for several years, reopening in December 2007. Now again it officially closed as of 20 January 2024. Due to strong El Niño, the Western Breach has washed down the mountain. This huge runoff has carved new ravines on the slopes and seems to be dislodging the sediment that cements the rock together, disrupting the rock stability. At the route's base, rain water has opened new drainages and there is an active, flowing river through the Arrow Glacier Camp where there has been no water at all for decades. The improper disposal of human waste on the mountain environment has created a health hazard, necessitating the boiling of all water.

According to the Kilimanjaro Christian Medical Centre in Moshi, 25 people died from January 1996 to October 2003 while climbing the mountain. Seventeen were female and eight were male, ranging in age from 29 to 74. Fourteen died from advanced high altitude illness, including one with HACE, five with HAPE, and six with both HACE and HAPE. The remaining eleven deaths resulted from "trauma (3), myocardial infarction (4), pneumonia (2), cardio-pulmonary failure of other underlying cause (1), and acute appendicitis (1). The overall mortality rate was 13.6 per 100,000 climbers."

== In literature and media ==
Kilimanjaro is a snow-covered mountain 19,710 feet high, and is said to be the highest mountain in Africa. Its western summit is called the Masai 'Ngaje Ngai', the House of God. Close to the western summit there is a dried and frozen carcas of a leopard. No one has explained what the leopard was seeking at that altitude.

— Ernest Hemingway's "riddle" preceding his 1936 short story The Snows of Kilimanjaro

Journalist Tom Bissell noted that Kilimanjaro is "perhaps the world's most literary mountain". The mountain is prominently featured in Ernest Hemingway's 1936 short story The Snows of Kilimanjaro, which was adapted into a 1952 film starring Gregory Peck. Dave Eggers wrote about his ascent in the short story Up the Mountain Slowly, Very Slowly. The ascent of Kilimanjaro is depicted in Andrei Gusev's 2020 novel Once in Malindi (in the 17th chapter). Writer Douglas Adams climbed the mountain in a rubber rhinoceros suit to raise money for African rhino conservation efforts.

Kilimanjaro was featured in Toto's 1982 song "Africa". An IMAX film documenting an ascent—Kilimanjaro: To The Roof Of Africa—was released in 2002. Kilimanjaro is also prominently featured in the Lion King franchise.

Mount Kilimanjaro is featured in the second mission of the first-person shooter video game Halo 3.

== See also ==
- List of highest mountains on Earth
- List of mountain peaks by prominence
