= Johann Andreas Danz =

German theologian

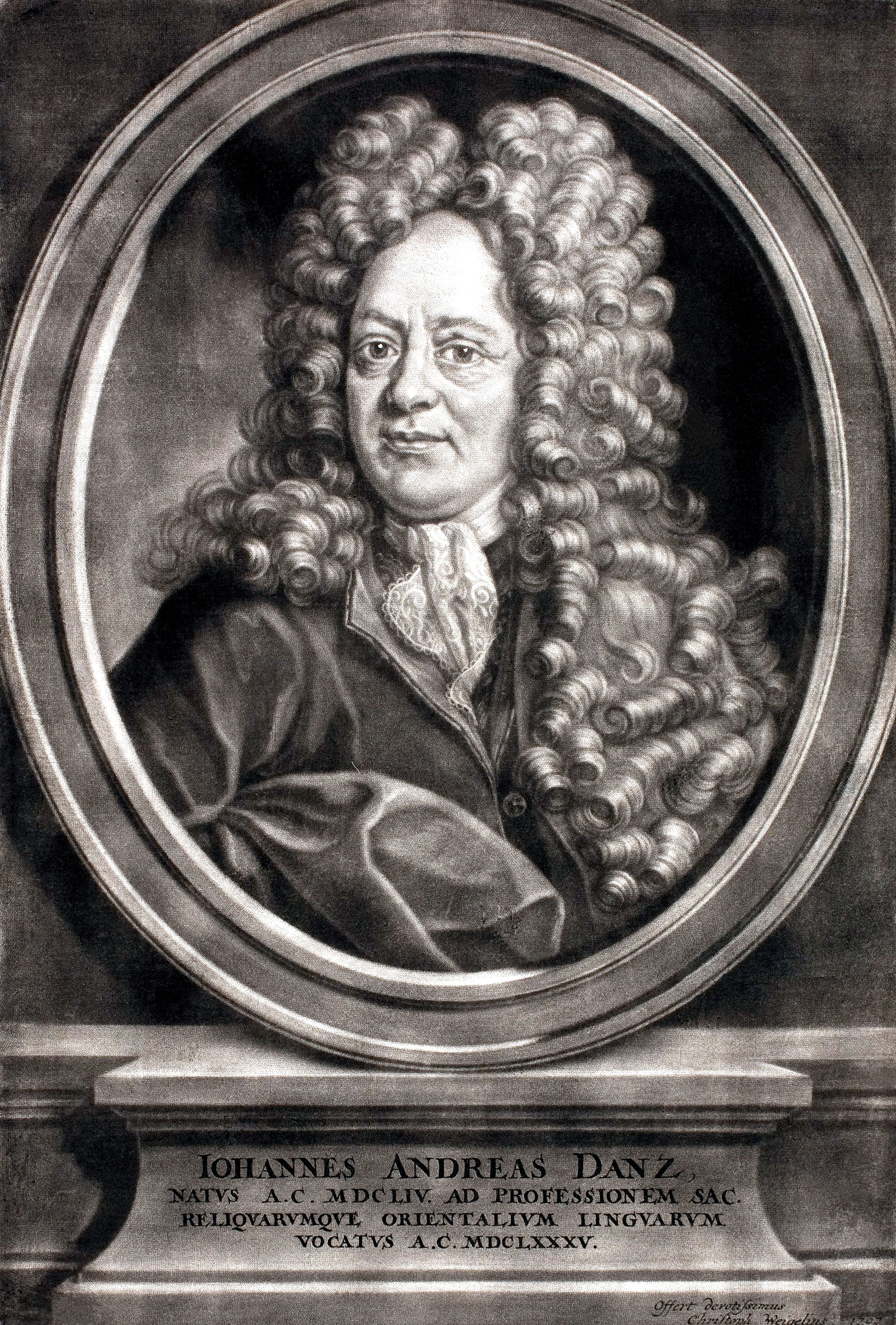
- 1708
- Born: 1 February 1654; Sundhausen, Saxe-Gotha, Holy Roman Empire
- Died: 20 December 1727; Jena, Saxe-Weimar, Holy Roman Empire
- Education: Wittemberg; Jena
- Occupations: Lutheran theologian Hebraist; University professor University rector
- Spouse: Anna Hedwig Luther
- Children: none
- Parents: Sebastian Danz (father); Anna Magdalena Gnüge (mother)

Johann Andreas Danz (1 February 1654 – 20 December 1727) was a German Lutheran theologian and Hebraist.

== Life ==
Johann Andreas Danz was born at Sundhausen, a village just outside Gotha in central Germany. His initial schooling was provided locally at the village school, but his exceptional scholastic potential was soon brought to the attention of the local duke, Friedrich of Gotha who took on responsibility for funding his higher education. When he was ten he was sent away to school in Friedrichroda, some twenty kilometers distant. Four years later, in 1668 he was enrolled at the prestigious "Gymnasium" (secondary school) in Gotha, at that time operating under the direction of Andreas Reyher who combined the two roles of school head and pioneering advisor on education reform to The Duke. In 1673 he moved on to the University of Wittemberg, matriculating on 17 September. He studied Philosophy, Philology and Theology, and received his Magister degree in Philosophy on 16 October 1676, four days after defending his work and surviving his "inaugural disputation".

The list of eminent scholars who taught Danz during his three years at the University of Wittemberg is a long one. Three, in particular, can be picked out on account of the extent to which they encouraged him to build and then deepen his knowledge of "Oriental languages", a term which at the time denoted languages having their origins in the more populated regions of the Middle East. These men were the theologian Johann Wilhelm Hilliger (1643–1705), the orientalist-lexicographer Andreas Sennert (1606–1689) and the philologist-theologian Theodor Dassov (1648–1721). Some posthumous sources focus exclusively on Danz's scholastic legacy as a Hebraist, but it seems that, especially during the earlier part of his academic career, his interest was caught by a range of middle eastern languages, also including in particular, the Aramaic languages and dialects. Inspired by what he had learned during just over three years at Wittemberg, during 1677 Danz relocated to Hamburg where, starting on 22 April, he embarked on an intensive period of study with the great Hebrew scholar, Esdras Edzardus (1629–1708). Others whom he met in Hamburg while studying with Edzardus included Dauidis Hieronymi, one of more than a hundred Jewish students and scholars whom Esdras Edzardus baptised into Christianity over the years, without on any way seeking to denigrate their Jewish heritage: the practice was considered worthy of note by commentators, however. Together Danz and Hieronymus read the (linguistically challenging) Zohar. He also met Jacob ben Abraham Fidanque, a controversial and briefly prominent Hamburg rabbi originally from Portugal.

From Hamburg he moved across to Leipzig, where during 1679 he briefly studied "Oriental languages" with Johann Benedict Carpzov at the university, before returning to Wittemberg, participating in a number of disputations and sharing in the teaching responsibilities there. Before the end of 1680 he had moved again, becoming a member of the University of Jena on 2 November 1680. It was at Jena that he received his Habilitation (higher university degree), a defining development in terms of his life-long university career. Danz's principal teachers following his enrolment at Jena were Georg Götze and Friedemann Bechmann. That same year, on the recommendation of his long-standing sponsor Duke Friedrich of Gotha, he was offered and accepted an adjunct professorship at the university.

It was, in the words of one source, "on the orders of his prince" ("auf Befehl seines Fuersten") that in 1683 Johann Andreas Danz set out on horseback for what became a two-year study tour across and beyond the German lands. The trip became a major networking exercise, enabling him to get to know many of the leading Orientalists and other scholars of the time. His first destination was Gießen where he met David Clodius and Kilian Rudrauff. He then moved south and joined up with the Pietist theologian (and pioneering genealogist) Philipp Spener, before moving on again, this time down the Rhine to Cologne where he stayed relatively briefly. His next destination was Leiden, home to one of Europe's top universities during this period. Here he was able to get to know, among others, the theologian-historian Friedrich Spanheim, the theologian-philologist Antonius Hulsius, the French Protestant scholar Étienne Le Moine and the classical theologian-commentator Johann Friedrich Gronovius. He also moved across to Utrecht where he was able to expand his circle of academic heavy-weights to include the Hebraist Johann Leusden, the philologist Johann Georg Graevius, the theologian Hermann Witsius and the Dutch reformed theologian Melchior Leydecker. He spent the winter in the United Provinces, also finding time to visit the great commercial centres of Rotterdam and Amsterdam, and then, on 17 March 1684, set sail for London in England, where he spent the summer of 1684, visiting the two great universities at Oxford and Cambridge. Initially he had to stay longer than planned with the priest Gerhard Martini in London due to having broken a leg. His principal interlocutor at Oxford was the distinguished orientalist Edward Pococke. At Cambridge those whom he met included the noted Hebraist scholar John Spencer, the brilliant mathematicians Isaac Newton and the orientalist Edmund Castell. By the end of the year he was back in the Netherlands, where he matriculated and briefly studied as a post-graduate student at the university on 21 November 1685. While in the Netherlands he also had the opportunity to spend time at the universities Franeker and Groningen, expanding further the number of his acquaintances and the extent of his own international reputation.

He returned by way of Bremen, Hamburg and Helmstedt. Towards the end of 1685 he accepted a job at Jena as Associate Professor of Holy and Oriental Languages, taking up the appointment in January 1686. After the death of Johann Frischmuth during the summer of 1687, Danz took over his professorial chair, thereby becoming a full professor. Although he continued to enjoy a stellar reputation as a professor of oriental and biblical languages, it is clear from the written work he continued to produce that he still sustained a lively appetite for theological and biblical study.

In January 1693 Johann Andreas Danz married Amma Hedwig Luther, the daughter of Gabriel Luther, a legal officer from Brandenburg. The marriage was childless.

On 6 January 1710, in parallel with his professorship as a languages teacher, Danz accepted an associate professorship in Theology. His first degree, nominally in Philosophy had been based on the study of Philology: he still had no first degree as a theologian, but that same month he accepted his Licentiate (a first degree) in Theology. A few weeks later, in February 1710, he also accepted a Doctorate in Theology in return for a piece of work on what was, to him, the outdated practice of punishing Jewish believers for taking initiation into the Christian Church|. (Note: "pro antiquitate baptisimi initiationis judaici vindicanda") (Much of his work during this period already concerned the interface between Judaism and Christianity.) In 1713 he received a full professorship in Theology from the university, which he would retain for the rest of his life. Danz also played his part in university administration, serving a term as university rector in 1693, and then again in 1701, 1714, 1718 and 1724.

Johann Andreas Danz died at Jena on 20 December 1727. His credentials as an outstandingly knowledgeable expert on "Oriental languages" were and are widely acknowledged by contemporaries and later scholars. His 1696 Hebrew Grammar (Note: "Compendium grammaticae hebraeae ad arctiores limites redactum") was for many years an indispensable volume for students of the subject, with revised editions appearing throughout the eighteenth century. That was a tribute to the work's central importance, but the book was never an easy read. There were criticisms that the generally unspoken base assumptions underlying Hebrew and Latin were different to the point of mutual incompatibility, making this attempt by a brilliant man to deal with one of these languages in terms of the other without drawing charges of obfuscation from frustrated users, a visibly impossible challenge. Nevertheless, many terms and phrases which subsequently became mainstream among philologists and other linguists working in this respected niche can be traced back to Johann Andreas Danz.

== Selected works ==
- Theses aliquot ad Jesaiae cap. LIII. Abarbaneli maxime, aliorumque Judaeorum commentis oppositas. Wittenberg 1679 (Präs. Andreas Sennert)
- Judaei proprio ingulati gladio in capito quidem Jes. LIII. Wittenberg 1679 (Resp. Nicol Bruns)
- Exercitationes Rabbinico-Talmundicae de decisionibus Krischma Ebraeorum. Pars prooemialis. Jena 1680 (Resp. Johann Georg Wittich)
- Caini nomen vindicatum secundum b. Lutheri versionem ex Gen. IV. I. Jena 1682 (Resp. Johann Phillip Juncker)
- Cain contra necem praemunitus in Gen. IV. 15. Jena 1682 (Resp. Stockmann)
- Exercitationis Rabbinico-Talmudicae, de sacris Judaeorum νομοφνλαχτηϛΙοις bis quotidie recitari solitis, Disp. II. Jena 1683 (Resp. Andreas Daniel Hattenbach)
- Functio Pontificis M. in adyto anniversaria Disp. I. ad ductum Ebr. IX. Jena 1683 (Resp. Johann Wilke)
- Uxor maritum repudians secundum leges Ebraeorum contra Josephum, pro illustrandisverbis Christi Marc. X. 12 et Pauli I Cor. VIII. 10.11.13.
- Alcorani cap. I etc. pars cap. II. arabice, cum versione Latina subiuncta.
- Nucifrangibulum scripturae sacrae veteris Testamenti ebraeae. Jena 1685, 1696 (and under the title: Literator Ebraeo-Chaldaeus... 1696)
- Animalia esu intordicta, ex Act. X. 12 seqq. Jena 1687 (Resp. Heinrich Ludwig Münster, Online)
- Spicilegium exhibens pro Chaldaismo biblico paucas intra horas addiscendo, nonnulla sparsim inserenda nucifrangibulo ebraeo. 1688
- De cura Judaeorum in conquirendis Proselytis, ad coliustrandum locum Matth. XXIII. 15. Jena 1688 (Resp. Johann Hartmann Scheibler)
- Aditus Syriae reclusus compendiuse ducens ad plenam linguae syriacae antiochenae seu maroniticae cognitionem, Jena 1689, 1735, Frankfurt 1765, (Resp. Jacob Velten)
- Dissertationum de baptismo initiationis Ebraeos inter et gentiles, prima proselytorum baptismum exhibens, ad illustrandum eum, qui a Johanne peractus. 1689, 1699, 1720
- Theses philologicae XX. vari argumenti. 1689 (Resp. Quodvultdeus Abraham Müller)
- De Ebraeorum re militari, ad Deut. XX. et XXI. Dissertatio prior. 1690 (Resp. Georg Ferdinand Gleich)
- Manuductio ad ebraeae linguae analysin facilius instituendam, eiusque rite adplicandam syntaxin. 1692
- Litterator ebraeo-chaldaeus, plenam utriusque linguae vet. Testamenti institutionem harmonice tradens. Item Interpres ebraeo-chaldaeus, omnes utriusque linguae idiotismos explicans. 1696
- Interpres ebraeo chaldaicus. 1696, 1755, 1773 German 1757, Leipzig 1780
- Rabbibismus enucleatus, praemissa directione legendi scripturam absque punctis. Jena 1699, 1735,
- Christi curatio Sabbatica, vindicata ex legibus, contra iudaicas columnias, judaicis. 1699 (Resp. M. Johann Conrad Wake, Online)
- Baptisimus proseytorum judaicus e monumentis ebraeo – talmundicis erutus. 1699
- Partur virginis miraculosus ex Jes. VII. 14. 1700 (Resp. M. Heinrich Kirschgart, Online)
- Origo talionis ad mentem Gentilium, Judaeorum ac Christianorum examinata, occasione Matth. V. 38.39. 1700 (Resp. Philipp Julius Rethmeier, Online)
- Nouilunii initiatio e Maimonide. 1703 (Resp. Heinrich Bernhard Witter)
- Dissertatio historico-apolegetica pro Luthero, ex acrmonia stili reprehenso. 1704 (Resp. Coelestin Amando Prinz)
- Compendium Grammaticae ebraeo chaldaicae. Jena 1706, 1765 (Online) (Online), 1735, 1742, Frankfurt 1748
- Interpretis ebraeo-chaldaci sinopsis. 1708, 1715 (Online), 1736
- Paradigmata nominum simlicium et verborum integra. 1709, 1731(Online), 1735, 1751 (Online)
- Creophagiam ante diluuium licita. 1709 (Resp. Heinrich Scharbau, (Online))
- Antiquitas baptismi initiationis Israelitarum vindicata, contra adscribentis ipsi originem christianam, pro Licentia summos in Theol. honores capessendi. 1710, 1715, 1720 (Präs. Johann Franz Buddeus)
- Davidis in Ammonitas deuictos mitigata crudolitas, ceu specimen sinceritatis scripturae, Musora throno mota, triumphantis, ... servato, verbisque 2. Sam. XII. 31. absque praejudicio versis, adserta. 1710 (Resp. Gotthard Georg Schrader)
- Dissertatio praelimiinaris, sistens pluratitatem personarum divinarum in consultatione Dei de primo creando homine Gen. I. 26. descripta. 1710
- Divina inter coaequales de primo homine condendo deliberatio, Gen. I. 26. descripta, pro pluralitute personarum divinarum e veteri Testamento adserenda. 1711 (Resp. Christoph von Kalm)
- Dissertat. harmonicobiblico-philol. qua harmoniam vitae Salomonis ad ductum priorum capitum lib. I. Reg. et 2. Chron. exhibet. 1711 (Resp. Heinrich Gottlieb Reime, Online)
- Sinceritas scripturae vet. Test. pracualente Keri vacillans. 1713
- Pascha Indaeorum abrogatum surrogato in eius locum festo resurrectioneis dominicae. 1713
- Promulgatio Evangelii haud obscutii expers. 1715
- Festum septimanarum iudaicum abrogatum, surrogato in eius locum festo Christianorum pentecostali. 1715–1719
- ... Filiavocis, nefanda divinae acmula. 1716 (Resp. Friedrich Ludwig Munster)
- Sinceritas Scripturae vet. Testamenti, suspicitione erroris in decade exemplorum, Arabeneli ac adseclis incusatorum abstersa, eluctans. 1717 (Resp. M. Johann Heinrich Olpe)
- Inauguratio Christi ad doccendum haud obscurior masaica, e spectaculis circa baptismum Christi universae multitudini visis ac distincte intellectis, ad Dei cum Mose Exod. XIX. colloquium collatis. 1717 (Online)
- De λύτϛω redemtionis bumanae ex parallelismo locorum Jes. LIII. vers. inprimis 10 et I Petr. I. 18.19. 1720 (Resp. Johann Moneta)
- De gratiosa Dei cobabitatione, ad Joh. XIV. 23 et Leu. IX. 4. 6. 23. 1720 to 1724
- De Jesu Christi filii Dei coaeterna cum patre existentia contra Wilh. Whistonum, auctore Joh. Casp. Gunthero inaug. dissert. pro summis in Theol. honeribus obtinendis. 1726
