= Friedemann Bechmann =

German Lutheran theologian (1628–1703)

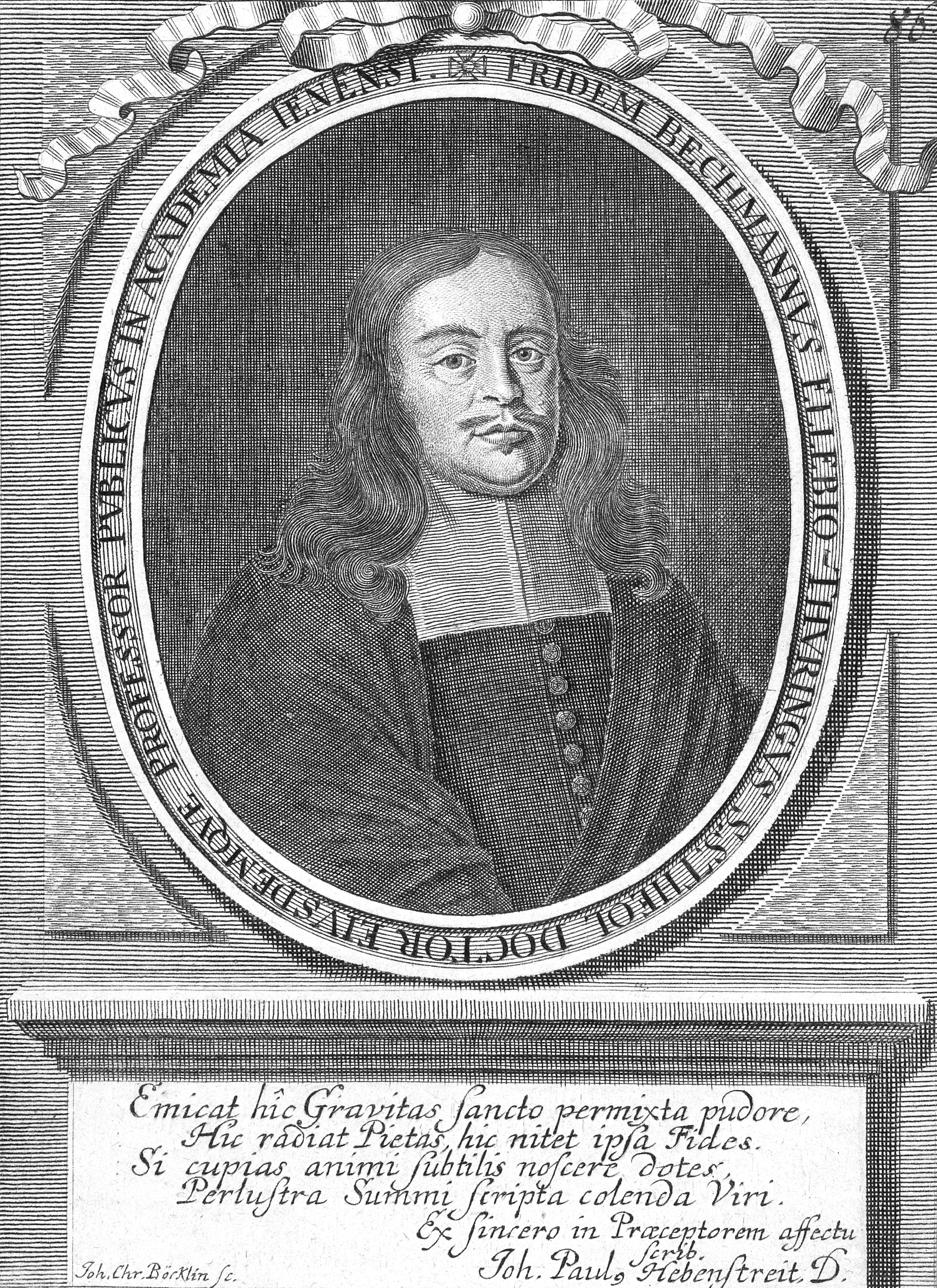
- Born: 26 May 1628; Elleben, Ilm-Kreis, Thuringia, Holy Roman Empire
- Died: 9 March 1703 (aged 74); Jena, Ilm-Kreis, Thuringia, Holy Roman Empire
- Education: University of Jena

Friedemann Bechmann (26 May 1628 – 9 March 1703) was a German Lutheran theologian.

== Life ==
Friedemann Bechmann was born in Elleben, a small town in the principality of Schwarzburg-Sondershausen, a short distance to the north of Erfurt. His father, Andreas Bechmann, was a church pastor originally from Remda, nearby. However, his father died in 1633 and after his mother, born Anna Maria Glass, also died, in 1637, he was taken in by his mother's brother, the physician Balthasar Glass, and grew up in Arnstadt. Later he was taken on by another of his mother's relatives, Salomo Glass, and educated at the gymnasium (secondary school) in Gotha where his teachers included Andreas Reyher and, between 1647 and 1649, Georg Heß.

In 1649 Bechmann transferred to the University of Jena where he enrolled to study Philosophy and Theology. On 5 August 1651 he was awarded his Magister degree. In the Philosophy faculty he attended lectures and tutorial sessions presented by Johann Zeisold (1599–1667), Daniel Stahl (1589–1654), Paul Slevogt (1596–1655) and Johann Christfried Sagittarius (1617–1689). Over in the Theology faculty, those who taught him included Johannes Musaeus (1613–1681), Christian Chemnitz (1615–1666) and Johann Ernst Gerhard the elder.

After Stahl's death in 1654 he obtained a permanent position as am "adjunct" in philosophy at the university and on 16 January 1656 Bechmann took over Stahl's teaching chair, as professor of Logic and Philosophy. In 1668 he also became a professor of Theology, taking the position vacated through the death of Johann Ernst Gerhard, and received an honorary Theology doctorate.

He was appointed Rector of the university for the summer term of 1665. His second appointment as rector covered the winter term of 1671. Rectors at Jena were always appointed for six month terms: between 1665 and 1697 Friedemann Bechmann served as Jena University Rector seven times.

Friedemann Bechmann died in Jena on 9 March 1703.

== Families ==
Friedemann Bechmann married twice. His first marriage, in 1659, was to Margarete Roth (1641–1665). A son is known to have been born to the couple:

- Andreas Bechmann (1662–1720) who became a successful physician

Bechmann's second marriage, in 1666, was to Regina Maria Frischmuth. She was the daughter of Johann Frischmuth the university professor of Oriental studies. Through her mother she was also a grand daughter of Bechmann's old tutor, Paul Slevogt. Five children are known to have resulted from this marriage:

- Christina Maria Bechmann (who predeceased her father) She married the physician Joachim Seeck.
- Johann Tobias Bechmann (who predeceased his father)
- Anna Maria Bechmann who married the consistorial assessor, Christian Hübner
- Elisabeth Magdalena Bechmann
- Heinrich Friedemann Bechmann

== Output (selective listing) ==
Numerous disputations by Bechmann are known to have been produced in the context of his teaching work. These were added as supplementary sections to works produced by his students. Of his independent works, the following merit mention:

- Systema Physicum. Jena 1665, 1675
- Institutiones Logicae ex Aristotele eijusque optimis tum Graecis tum Latinis interpretibus concinnatae. Jena 1667, 1670, 1677, Leipzig & Gotha 1691 (8. Aufl.)
- De modo Solvendi Sophismata Tractatus Logicus. Jena 1667 (Online), Gera 1671
- Frommer Christen Heimfahrt oder Leich-Predigt, bei Beerdigung Herrn Joh. Andr. Bosii, P.P. Jena 1674
- In Augustanam Confessionem. Jena 1677
- Annotationes uberiores in Compendium Hutteri Theologiam polemicam. Jena 1690, 1692
- Theologiam polemicam, conscientiania. Frankfurt & Leipzig 1698, 1702
- Haeresiographia, in qua per singula secula ostenditur, quomodo Satanas Christum eiusque Ecclesiam per falsa dogmata oppugnauerit. Jena 1700
- Institutiones Theologicas, in quibus articuli fidei tractantur, usus practici eruuntur, casus dubii et difficiles enodantur et variae questiones soluuntur. Jena 1701, 1707
- Annotationes ad D. Jo. Olearii Tabulas Theologiae moralis. Jena 1702
- Gottseliges vergieß mein nicht, d. i. Christl. und erbauliche Betrachtung der letzten Dinge des Menschen. Jena 1701
