= Johann Jakob Müller (philosopher) =

German moral philosopher (1650-1716)

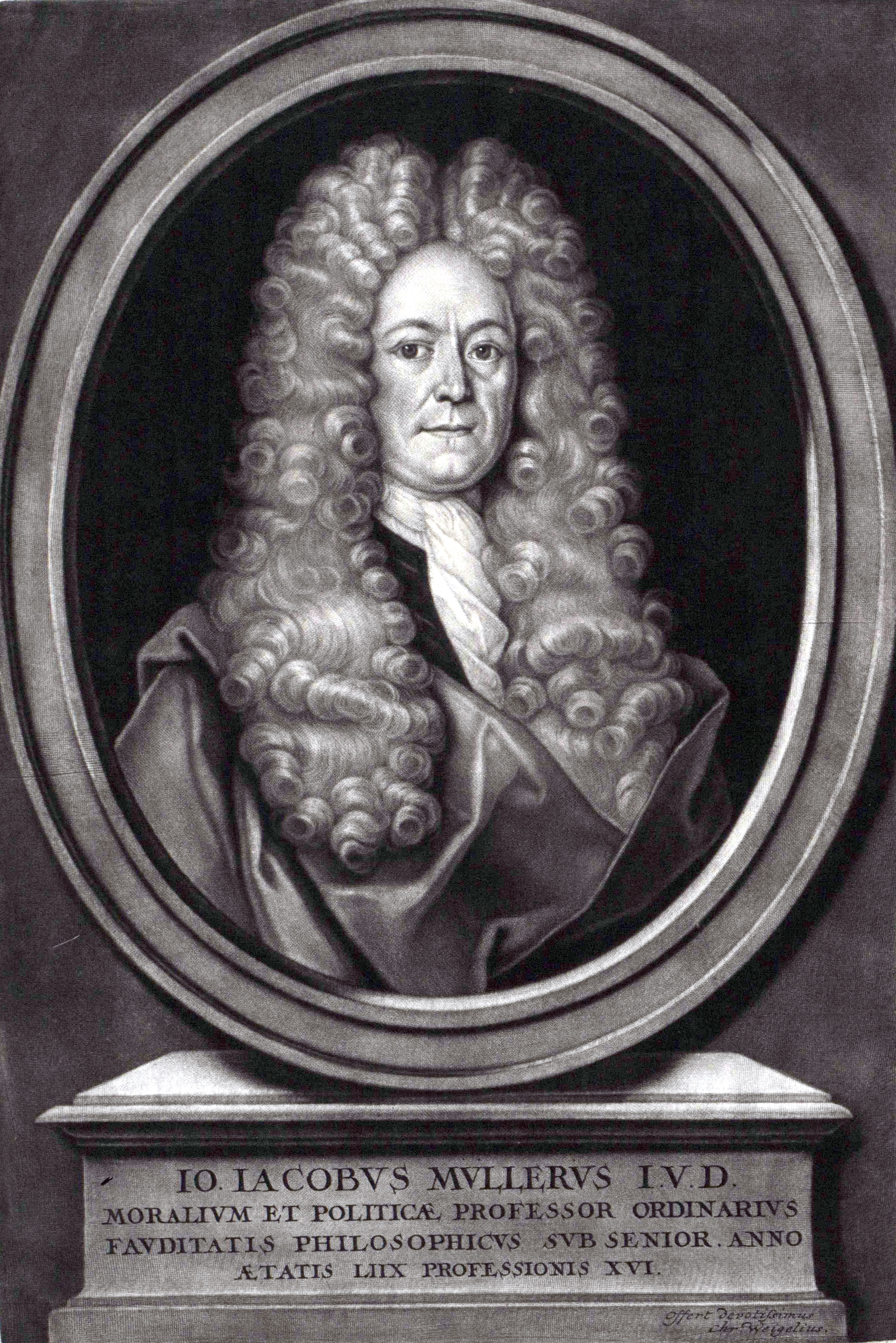

Johann Jakob Müller (31 May 1650 - 13 April 1716) was a German moral philosopher.

== Life ==
Johann Jakob Müller was born at Jena in 1650. His father, another Johann Müller (1615-1688), was the deputy head of the city school. Johann Jakob Müller attended the school, then under the rectorship of Johann Martin Ringler. Recognising an exceptional talent, his parents also arranged for him to receive private tutoring at home from Anton Mosnern, a churchman from nearby Saalfeld. Aged only 15 Müller started attending lectures at the university. At the Philosophy faculty his teachers included Johann Frischmuth, Erhard Weigel, Caspar Posner, Johann Andreas Bose, Valentin Veltheim, Johannes Musaeus, Johann Wilhelm Baier and Friedemann Bechmann.

In 1677 Müller received his degree, becoming a Master of Philosophy. At the university he became an Adjunct in the Philosophy faculty, supplementing his income with an appointment as a domestic tutor further to north. For the next thirty years he published a succession of disputations on a range of ethical topics.

On 12 April 1692 he was appointed Visiting Professor in Philosophy at Jena. On 8 January 1695 he was appointed full Professor of Poetry and on 14 September 1698 he received the teaching chair in Logic. After receiving a licentiate in Laws on 23 October 1699, on 18 February 1700 he received his Doctorate of laws. On 5 September 1705 he took on the professorship of Ethical Moral Philosophy and Politics.

Müller also took his turn at administrative duties, serving several times as dean of the Philosophy faculty. During the Winter Term of 1704/05 he served as Rector at the University of Jena.

== Publications (not a complete list) ==
- Disp. de Moralitate inculpatae Tutelae. Jena 1680
- Disp. de Regressu demonstrativo. Jena 1680
- Disp. de Fide fracta. Jena 1680
- Disp. de Propaedeumatibus. Jena 1685
- Disputatio de Imperio Dictatoris. Jena 1687
- Institutiones Ethicae Positivo-Polemicae. Jena 1691
- Institutiones Politicae Positivo-Polemicae ad filum Aristotelis concinnatae. Jena 1691, 1705
- Institutiones Jurisprudentiae Gentium. Jena 1693
- Disp. de Jure Transitus per alterius Territorium. Jena 1693
- Disp. de jure Feciali. Jena 1693
- Disp. de Morte vicaria. Jena 1695
- Commentarius in Guil. Grotii Enchiridion de Principiis Juris Naturae. Jena 1696
- Disp. de Fictionibus Juris Naturae et Gentium. Jena 1696
- Disp. de Occisione Furis nocturni ad Hugo Grotii J. B. & P. II. I. Jena 1697
- Disp. de summo Bono Civili non consistente in Divitiis. Jena 1697
- Disp. de Jure Partis majoris. Jena 1697
- Disp. de Obligatione Subditorum ex Delicto summae Potestatis ad Hug. Grotii de I. B. & P. lib. 2. C. 21. Jena 1698
- Disp. de Syllogismis compositis. Jena 1698
- Disp. de Modis abolendi Culpam et Reatum. Jena 1700
- Disp. de Moralitate Reservationum mentalium in juramento. Jena 1701
- Disp. de Praesumptionibus Moralibus. Jena 1701
- Disp. de Virtutibus ac Vitiis Philosophorum Orientalium. Jena 1701
- Disp. de Duellis Principum. Jena 1702
- Disp. de Imperio Civili in Statu Innocentiae extituro. Jena 1703
- Introductio in Artem Emblematicam. Jena 1706
- Disp. de Imputatione Morali. Jena 1707
- Disp de Jure Retorsionis inter Status Imperii. Jena 1707
- Disp. de jure Superiorum in Juramenta Inferiorum. Jena 1708
