= Myconius =

Myconius is a surname. Notable people with the surname include:

- Friedrich Myconius (1490–1546), German theologian
- Oswald Myconius (1488–1552), Swiss theologian and reformer
