= Eduard Wilhelm Sievers =

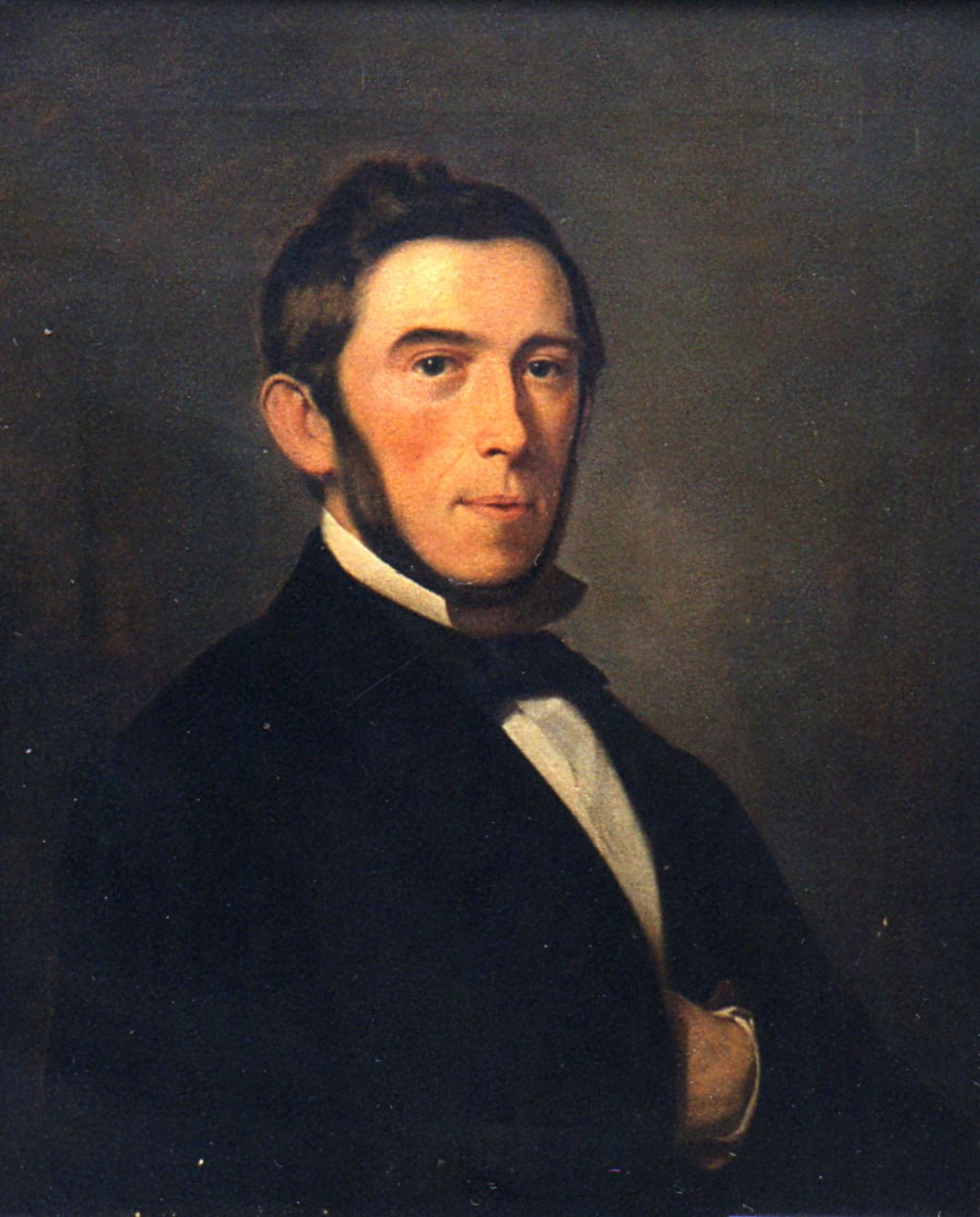
Eduard Wilhelm Sievers, 1820–1894

Eduard Wilhelm Sievers (born 19 March 1820 in Hamburg; died 9 December 1894 in Gotha) was a German Shakespeare scholar and professor in Gotha.

Sievers descended from a Hanseatic merchant family. He was cousin of the historian Gottlob Reinhold Sievers and uncle of the geographer Wilhelm Sievers. He studied in Gotha, Berlin and Bonn before earning his Ph.D. in 1842 in Erlangen with De Odrysarum imperio commentatio. After some time teaching at the Johanneum in Hamburg, he started in 1845 at the Ernestinum in Gotha.

Sievers published German translations of William Shakespeare's plays and poems along with books about Shakespeare's works.

In 1882, he became Rector of the Ernestine Gymnasium, Gotha, succeeding Joachim Marquardt.

== Selected works ==
- De Odrysarum imperio commentatio. P. Neusser, Bonn 1842
- Über die Tragödie überhaupt und Iphigenie in Aulis insbesondere. Als Manuscript gedruckt. Hamburg and Gotha, 1847
- Über die Grundidee des Shakespeareschen Dramas Othello. Gotha, 1851
- Shakespeare's Dramen für weitere Kreise bearbeitet. No. 1-5. Leipzig, 1851–53
- Othello ... Erklärt von Dr. E. W. Sievers. Herrig (L.) Sammlung englischer Schriftsteller. Vol. 4, 1853
- Julius Caesar ... Erklärt von Dr. E. W. Sievers. Herrig (L.) Sammlung englischer Schriftsteller. Vol. 8, 1853
- William Shakespeare. Sein Leben und Dichten. Rud. Besser, Gotha 1866
- Shakespeare's zweiter mittelalterlicher Dramen-Cyclus. Mit einer Einleitung von W. Wetz. Reuther & Reichard, Berlin 1896

== Biography ==
- Shakespeare Jahrbuch, 31 (1895), S. 369-370

== Literature ==
- C.S. Lewis, Hamlet: The Prince or the Poem?, Proceedings of the British Academy 18 (1942)
