= Slevogt =

Slevogt is a German language surname from the words Schlehe=sloe and Vogt=reeve. Notable people with the name include:

- Marquardt Slevogt (1909–1980), German ice hockey player
- Max Slevogt (1868–1932), German Impressionist painter and illustrator
- Paul Slevogt (1596–1655), German philologist
