= Karl Ullmann =

German Calvinist theologian (1796–1865)

Carl Christian von Ullmann (March 3, 1796, Epfenbach, Electoral Palatinate – January 12, 1865, Karlsruhe) was a German Reformed theologian.

== Biography ==
He studied at Heidelberg and Tübingen, and in 1820 delivered exegetical and historical lectures at Heidelberg. He received a professorship at Heidelberg from 1821 to 1829. In 1829 he went to Halle upon Saale as professor to teach church history, dogmatics and symbolics, but in 1836 he returned to a chair at Heidelberg, where he taught until 1856. Between 1853 and 1861 he officiated as prelate, i.e. spiritual leader, of the United Evangelical Protestant State Church of Baden (German: Vereinigte Evangelisch-protestantische Landeskirche Badens).

A lifelong exponent of the Vermittlungstheologie school of theology, in 1828, with the help of Friedrich Wilhelm Carl Umbreit (1795–1860), he founded and edited the Theologische Studien and Kritiken in its interests. When Julius Wegscheider and Wilhelm Gesenius were denounced by Hengstenberg as rationalists, he pleaded for freedom in theological teaching (cf. his Theol. Bedenken, 1830). On the other hand, he vigorously attacked David Strauss. His Historisch oder mythisch? Beiträge zur Beantwortung der gegenwärtigen Lebensfrage der Theologie (1838; 2nd edition, 1866) was a reply to Strauss's Life of Jesus, and his criticism resulted in Strauss making numerous concessions in later works.

Ullmann became second class associate member of the Royal Institute of the Netherlands in 1844, he resigned when this institute was disbanded in 1851. He joined the successor institute, the Royal Netherlands Academy of Arts and Sciences as foreign member in 1855.

== Works ==
In Das Wesen des Christenthums (1845; 5th edition, 1865; English translation, 1860), Ullmann explains that Christianity is independent of the orthodox formulas, and contends that a distinction should be made between faith and dogmatics. His principal historical works are Gregor von Nazianz (1825; 3rd edition, 1867) and Die Reformatoren vor der Reformation (The Reformers before the Reformation, 2 volumes, 1841; 2nd edition, 1866; Eng. trans., 1854). Another well-known work is Die Sundlösigkeit Jesu (The Sinlessness of Jesus, 1854; English translation 1858 and 1870).
