= Johann Ernst Gerhard the elder =

German Lutheran theologian (1621-1668)

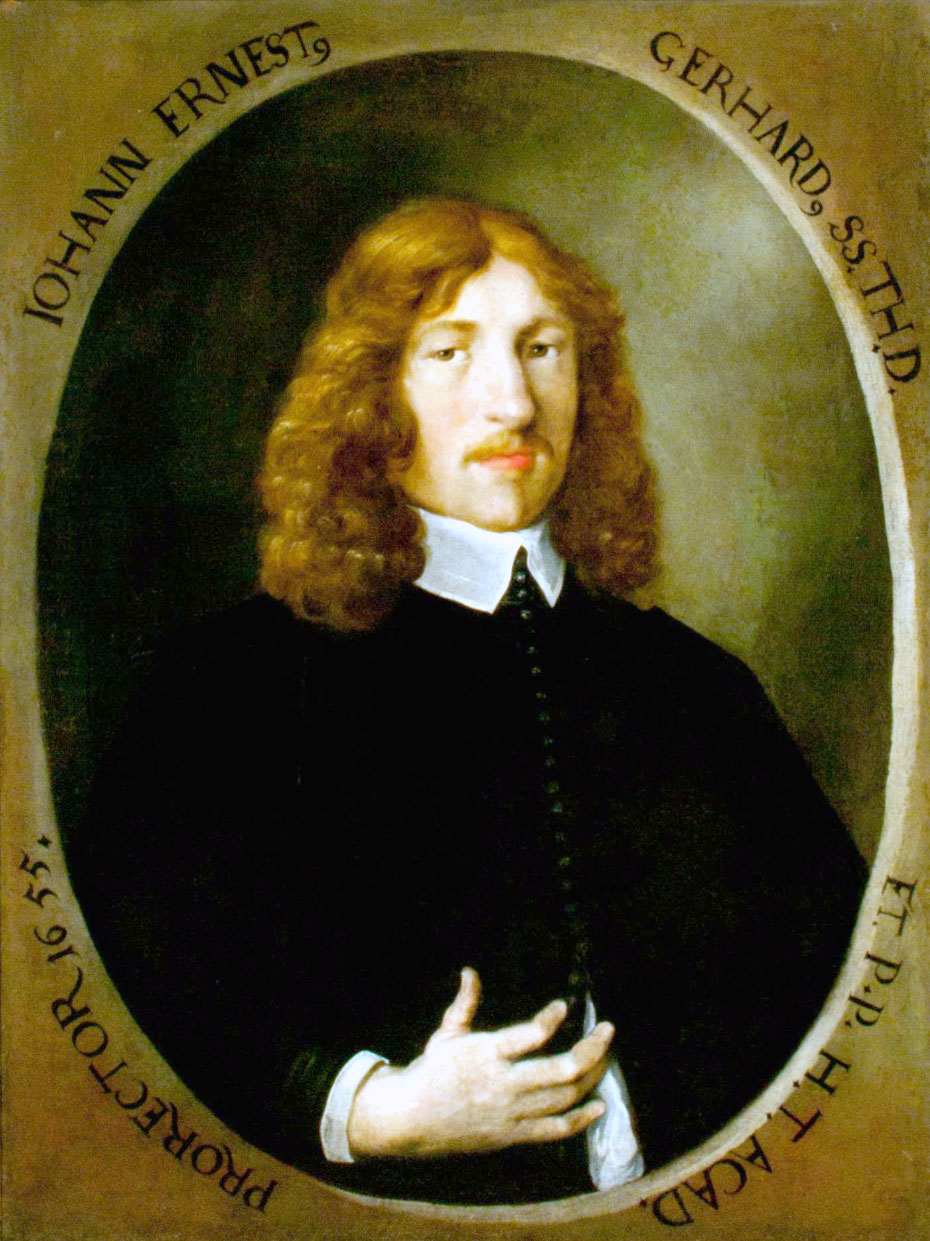
Johann Ernst Gerhard der Ältere (1621-1668) Christian Richter, 1655

Johann Ernst Gerhard (15 December 1621 - 24 February 1668) was a German Lutheran theologian. There are suggestions, however, that his greater scholarly passion lay in Oriental studies.

Latin language sources identify him as Joannes Ernestus Gerhardus (or Gerhardus, Joannes Ernestus).

== Life ==
Johann Ernst Gerhard was born in Jena, a well established center of Protestant scholarship. His father Johann Gerhard (1582-1637), was a leading theologian, and some sources hint or suggest that the son never fully measured up to his father's intellectual stature. Johann Ernst Gerhard was the first child of his father's second marriage, to Maria Gerhard,(born Maria Muttenberg).

Gerhard attended school in Jena till he was 15, when in 1637 he enrolled at Jena University, the focus of his studies being on Philosophy, Theology and Oriental languages. His principal tutor was Johann Michael Dilherr, a theologian also, at that time as professor of history and oratory. His other teachers included Balthasar Cellarius, Johannes Musaeus and Christian Chemnitz.

In 1640 he transferred to Altdorf where he was able to make progress with his study of oriental languages. By his early twenties he had mastered Hebrew, Aramaic, Syriac, Arabic, and Ge’ez. At the end of his time in Altdorf he traveled to Regensburg, at that time the permanent seat of the Imperial Diet (Council), then returning to Jena by an indirect route involving Lower Saxony, stopping off at Helmstedt, Leipzig and Wittenburg. He was back at Jena by 8 August 1643, which was the day on which he received his Magister degree in Philosophy.

In 1646 he began a lengthy assignment at Wittenburg University where in 1649 he became an Adjunct in the Philosophy faculty. In the meantime he produced in 1647 his first major published work, "Harmonia linguarum orientalium, scil. Chaldaicae, Syriacae, Arabicae, Aethiopicae cum Ebraica". This was a "polyglot grammar", taking as its starting point Wilhelm Schickard's 1624 Hebrew Grammar. Gerhard, for his update, built not merely on the Hebrew section, but added a further four parallel columns incorporating equivalent information for Aramaic, Syriac, Arabic, and Ge’ez grammar.

Work on the "Harmonia linguarum orientalium" brought Gerhard into contact with a brilliant student in oriental studies, three year his junior, called Hiob Ludolf. Their friendship, conducted almost entirely by letter, began in 1644, and is unusually well documented, the relevant correspondence being included in an extensive Gerhardt archive held at the Gotha University research library. By the end of the 1640s Ludolf was working in Paris as a tutor to the children of his patron, who was the Swedish ambassador, following which the ambassador sent him on a lengthy scholarly assignment to Rome, but earlier in the decade he had studied for some years at Leiden University, which was a centre for Oriental Studies. He was able to provide his friend with a long list of important orientalist scholars and early in 1650 Gerhardt set off on his own "peregrinatio academica" ("academic pilgrimage") to Leiden. In the end Gerhardt's "peregrinatio academica" lasted two years, taking in not merely Holland, but also France, Burgundy and Switzerland.

He had barely returned to Jena when, in 1652, he was appointed a "Professor historiarum" ("Professor of History"). He received his Doctorate in Theology the next year, and two years after that, in 1655, was appointed a Professor of Theology. During the next few years he held various academic posts, showing himself according to one source to be "a man of liberal spirit but of poor health and of moderate gifts". Gerhard also took his share of administrative responsibilities. Between 1555 and 1931 Jena University rotated its senior administrative function twice a year. Gerhard served as University Rector during the winter semester of 1661 and again during the winter semester of 1667.

Johann Ernst Gerhard died of a high fever on 14 February 1668.

== Personal ==
Johann Ernst Gerhard received his doctorate on 12 July 1643. That same day he married Katharina Elisabeth Plathner (1626-1671), originally from Langensalza. At the time of their marriage she was the widow of Christoph Schelhammer, a professor of medicine. Children of this marriage are known to have included:

- Johann Friedrich Gerhard (1654-1705)
- Sophie Elisabeth Gerhard
- Maria Elisabeth Gerhard (1659-1722) who married Johann Adrian Slevogt in 1682
- Johann Ernst Gerhard (1662-1707)

== Published output (selection) ==
- Harmonia linguarum orientalium, scil. Chaldaicae, Syriacae, Arabicae, Aethiopicae cum Ebraica, Jena 1647.
- Isagogne
- Epitome Confessionis Catholicae, Jena 1661.
- Sylloge decadum theologicarum, Jena 1654
