= Johann Kaspar Friedrich Manso =

German historian and philologist

Johann Kaspar Friedrich Manso (May 26, 1760 – June 9, 1826) was a German historian and philologist.

Manso was born in Zella-Mehlis, and studied in Jena. He taught at the Illustrious Gymnasium in Gotha from 1785, and in 1790 moved to the Magdaleneum in Breslau, where he was first prorector and then from 1793 rector. He died in Breslau in 1826.

He is also remembered today for a dispute with Friedrich Schiller. Writing in the journal Neue Bibliothek der schönen Wissenschaften und der freyen Künste, Manso criticized Schiller's writing for obscurantism, for the way he adopted Kantian terminology for his arguments, and for his idealization of Ancient Greece. Manso's own writing was in turn mocked by Schiller, writing together with Goethe, in their Xenien.

== Works ==
Historical:

- Sparta, ein Versuch zur Aufklärung der Geschichte und Verfassung dieses Staats (Leipzig, 1800–1805, 3 vols.)
- Leben Konstantins des Großen (Breslau, 1817)
- Geschichte des preußischen Staats seit dem Hubertsburger Frieden (Frankfurt, 1819–1820, 3 vols.; 2nd ed. 1835)
- Geschichte des ostgotischen Reichs in Italien (Breslau, 1824)

Philological:

- An edition of Meleager (Gotha, 1789)
- An edition of Bion and Moschus with a German translation (Gotha, 1784; 2nd ed. Leipzig, 1807)

Miscellaneous writings:

- Vermischte Schriften (Gotha, 1801, 2 vols.)
- Vermischte Abhandlungen (Breslau, 1821)
