= Johann Georg August Galletti =

German historian and geographer

Johann Georg August Galletti (19 August 1750 – 16 March 1828) was a German historian and geographer. Galletti was born in Altenburg, Holy Roman Empire. His fame is not based on his merits as an academic, but on his reputation as the creator of a few hundreds of stylistic howlers, becoming a legend as Kathederblüten (teacher's howlers) originated during his time as a professor at the Ernestine Gymnasium in Gotha. He was known as the "absent-minded professor of Gotha" and died there aged 77.

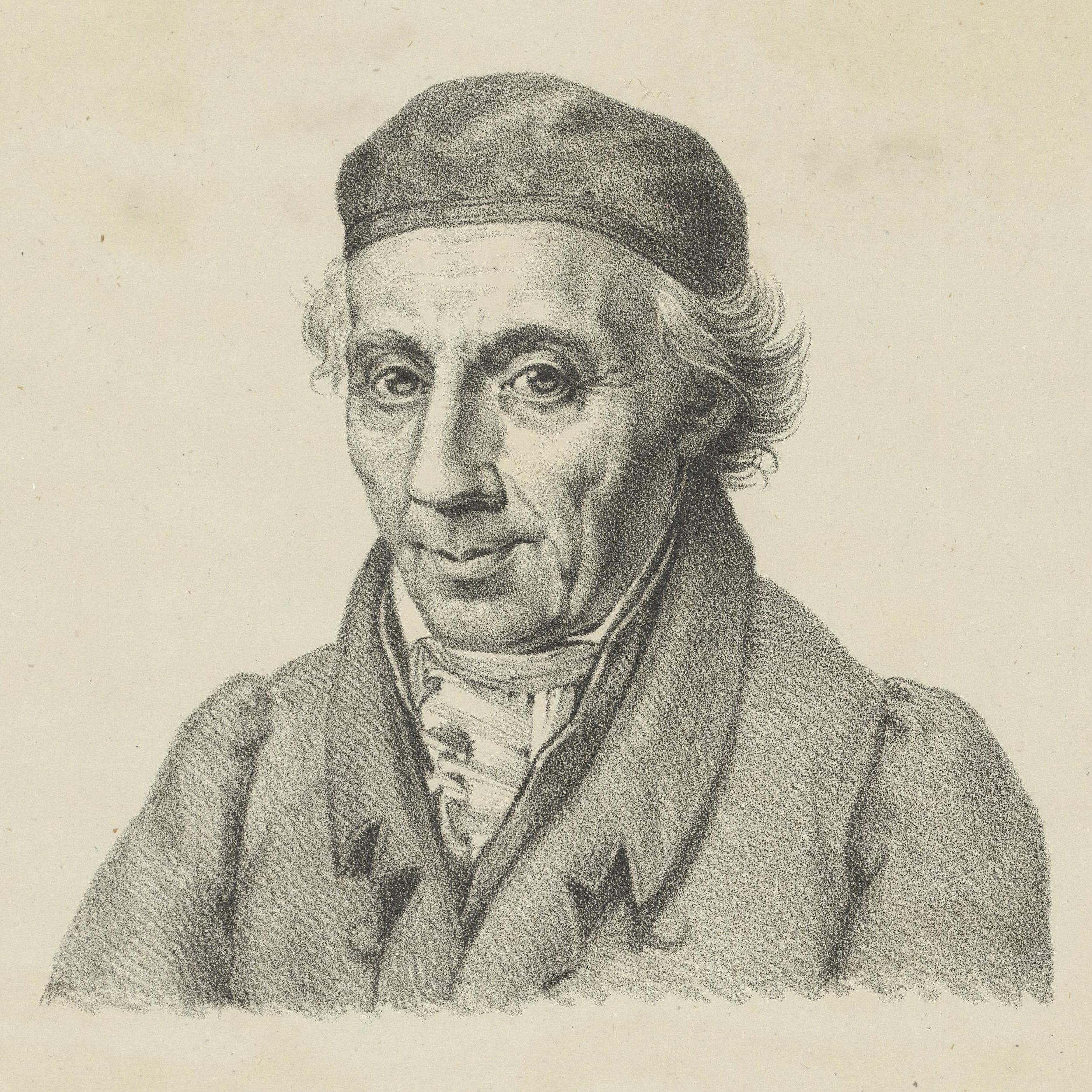
Johann Georg August Galletti.

Some Kathederblüten of Galletti:

- After the Battle of Leipzig you could see horses with three, four, or even more legs shot off running loose all over the countryside.
- Deiotarus was his father's son.
- Indeed, Councillor, I am well pleased with Blädner, but with Seifert not at all; but at least he's better than Blädner.
- So you think that history is as easy as playing schnapsen? Ha! You can learn history in a flash, but learning schnapsen takes years of hard graft.
- The African Lion usually grows up to the age of ten, and from then on, its size simply increases.
- Alexander would have gone on to conquer all Asia; but he's going to die soon.
- And thus, there ensued an entire war on page 94.
- I've exited the monk too early. His exit doesn't come earlier than right now.
- Today, I'm once again seeing so many students that aren't there!
- Watch out, I'm going to slap you if you aren't disobedient at once!
- Charlemagne won as often against the Saxons that in the end they wouldn't even wait for it any-more.
- Among the masterpieces of Demosthenes, we have his celebrated speech on the wreath. This speech is well known to begin with the immortal words: "Which rascal is throwing spit wads here again?"
- And you, Schäfer, you don't belong amongst decent people at all. Come to me at the lectern in front.
- The Persians cried out loud: "Good Lord Jesus, the Athenians are coming!" and threw themselves into the sea.
- The Venetian constitution is a mixed aristocracy which it is very difficult to get out of again.
- The pig is justly named that way, for it is a very dirty animal.
- The soldiers threw their weapons away and said: "pardon [me]". ("asking for pardon" means "asking for quarter" in German)
