= Johann Frischmuth =

German orientalist (1619–1687)

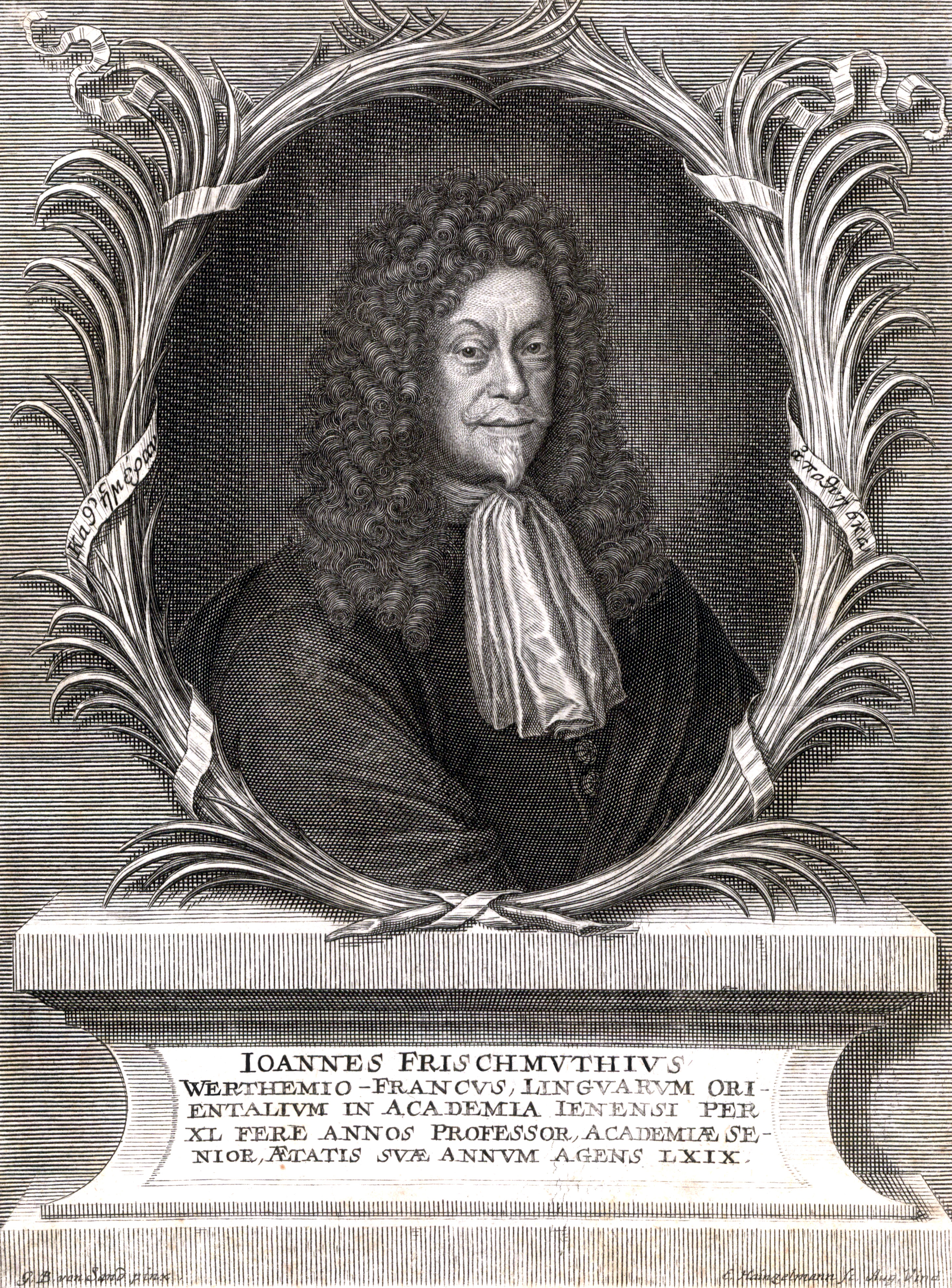
Elias Hainzelmann, ca. 1687

Johann Frischmuth (18 March 1619 – 19 August 1687) was a German Orientalist.

== Life ==
Johann Frischmuth was born in Wertheim a small town and regional centre in the hills to the west of Würzburg. His father, a baker, was also called Johann Frischmuth: his mother was born Margaretha Buttel. The years 1618 to 1648 were dominated by the Thirty Years' War, as a result of which during his childhood he was moved from one place to another. It was to avoid the plague that the marauding armies brought in their wake that the family made their first move and left Wertheim. While they were living in the village of Reichenholz Frischmuth obtained schooling from the local priest. He then embarked on higher level studies at the University of Altdorf where the record of his matriculation (formal admission) is dated 5 November 1636. He was introduced to oriental languages by Theodor Hackspan and received his "Magister der philosophischen Wissenschaften" (loosely:"Master of Arts") degree in 1639.

In the Winter Semester of 1645 he switched to the University of Jena, where he attended lectures in the Theology and Philosophy faculties. Johannes Tobias Major, whose library he was permitted to use, exercised a particular influence on his thinking.

Successful defence of his dissertation "de praeceptis Noachidarum" ("On the Noahide Laws") opened the way for him to start lecturing at the university. In 1647 Johannes Müller tried to lure him away to the prestigious Gelehrtenschule des Johanneums (school) in Hamburg, but he preferred to stay at Jena where he was made rector of the city school the same year. In parallel with these duties he was also lecturing at the university where in 1649 he took on an associate professorship in oriental languages. Here he worked with Paul Slevogt on the institution's philological development. In 1652 he was appointed, in addition, to a full university professorship for poetry. Soon after Slevogt's death in 1655 Frischmuth resigned that professorship and took on, instead, the full professorship in the Greek and Hebrew languages which his senior colleague's death had left vacant. Frischmuth appears to have retained this post till his own death more than thirty years later.

Frischmuth also made his contribution on the administrative side, serving several stints as Dean of the Philosophy faculty. He also served as University Rector during the summer term of 1653 and again during the summer term of 1673.

Johann Frischmut died on 17 August 1687 in Jena. His body was buried there on 22 August and on 24 August a Memorial Mass was celebrated. By this time he had produced more than sixty philological-theological disputations. His professorship was taken on by one of his most brilliant students, Johann Andreas Danz.

== Family ==
Johann Frischmuth was married twice. His first marriage took place on 10 November 1648 in Jena, and was to Anna Maria Slevogt (1630–1672) who was a daughter of his colleague, Professor Paul Slevogt and Prof. Slevogt's wife, Ursula Freyer. Frischmuth's second marriage, after the death of Anna Maria, was to Magdalena Pascas.

His first marriage produced fiver recorded sons and seven recorded daughters. One son and three of the daughters died young. The couple's eldest daughter was Regina Maria Frischmuth who went on to marry Friedemann Bechmann on 20 November 1666.
