= Ernestine Gymnasium, Gotha =

Secondary school in Germany

Ernestinum Ernestine Gymnasium
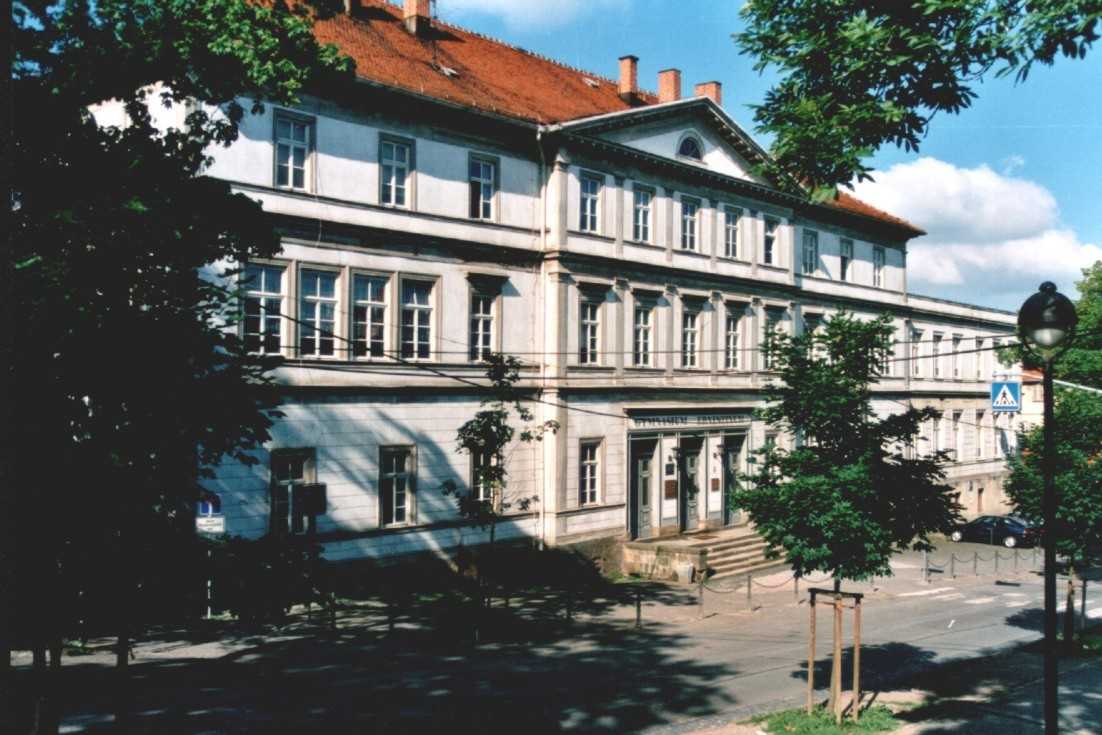

Location
- Bergallee 8; 99867 Gotha; Germany; 50°56′44″N 10°42′02″E

Information
- Former names: Gymnasium Gothanum (1524–1600); Illustrious Gymnasium (1600–1853)
- Motto: Cum Deo et die (With God and [with/in] the day)
- Established: 1524, re-named c. 1600, merged with Ducal Gymnasium and renamed again, 1853, closed 1947, refounded 1991
- Founder: Friedrich Myconius
- Closed: 1947–1991
- Principal: Ivonne Ludewig-Greipel
- Gender: coeducational (since 1991)
- Website: ernestinum-gotha.de

The Ernestine Gymnasium (Latin name: Ernestinum, used in German) is a humanistic and modern gymnasium in Gotha, Germany, the successor of the Illustrious Gymnasium (Gymnasium Illustre), founded in 1524, which in 1853 was merged with the recently founded Real-Gymnasium Ernestinum, named in honour of Ernest I, Duke of Saxe-Coburg and Gotha. The merged school continued to be known as the Ernestinum. Until 1947, when it was closed, it was considered the oldest gymnasium in the German-speaking world. It was re-founded in 1991, shortly after German reunification.

== History ==
The school's earliest forerunner was a Latin school at the parish church of St Mary, which is mentioned in 1291.

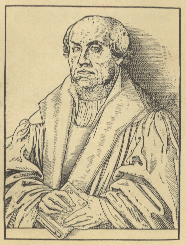
Friedrich Myconius, founder

On 21 December 1524, the school was founded by Friedrich Myconius, a friend of Martin Luther, in the cloister of the Augustinian monastery of Gotha, which was in the process of being dissolved, and was given the Latin name Gymnasium Gothanum. As a result of the Reformation, in the middle of the 16th century the curriculum was changed significantly, under the direction of Cyriacus Lindemann (1562–1568). His focus was grammar, the understanding of Roman authors, and careful written work by the students, and he also introduced declamation.

Around 1600, the school's name was honoured by the addition of "illustrious" by Duke John Casimir of Saxe-Coburg. Under the rector Andreas Wilke (1592–1631) the number of schoolmasters and classes increased.

In the 17th century, the school was further sponsored by Duke Ernest I of Saxe-Gotha-Altenburg. He gave asylum to sons of persecuted Lutherans from Hungary, Silesia, Poland, Russia, and Scandinavia, who joined the school. Under the rector Andreas Reyher (1641–1673), the Gotha school system was reformed on the principles of Wolfgang Ratke, and the school became known internationally. The number of subjects increased, with the introduction of Mathematics, poetry, and history, and for the first time there was teaching in German. Rhetoric, logic, ethics, and metaphysics, were taught in the Selecta, or final year. By 1723, the school was already known as the Gymnasium Ernestinum.

In the 18th century, the Enlightenment reshaped education in much of northern Europe, and the school received great support from Duke Ernest II of Saxe-Gotha-Altenburg, guided by the principle that good education in all subjects was essential for the economic and political stability of the Duchy. Under Johann Gottfried Geißler as rector (1768–1779), the time given to ancient languages was reduced in favour of the natural sciences and German, English, and French literature.

The school enjoyed notable rectors, including Friedrich Andreas Stroth (1779–1785), and Friedrich Wilhelm Döring (1786–1833), and also renowned schoolmasters such as Johann Georg August Galletti, Johann Friedrich Salomon Kaltwasser, Adolf Heinrich Friedrich von Schlichtegroll, Johann Kaspar Friedrich Manso, and Friedrich Jacobs.

In 1807, the future philosopher Arthur Schopenhauer was admitted to the school and in 1808 was expelled for a prank.

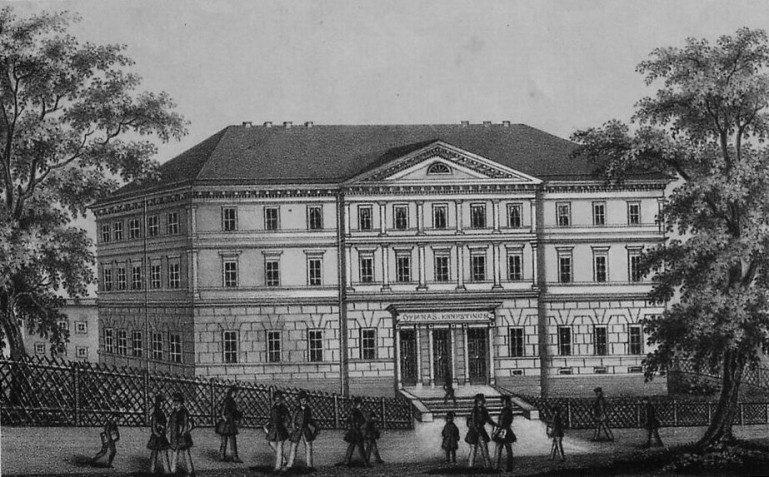
The new building in the Bergallee, pictured about 1840

Between 1837 and 1838, a new school building was built in the classical style in the Bergallee. However, the school was challenged by a new competitor, founded in 1836 by the reigning Duke for the benefit of the bourgeoisie, the Real-gymnasium Ernestinum, which had a chiefly scientific and mathematical curriculum. At the older school, chemistry, physics, and geology began to be taught as separate subjects, and the modern languages French and English overtook Latin in importance.

On 12 April 1859, the Illustrious Gymnasium and the Ducal Realgymnasium were merged into a single school, which was named Gymnasium Ernestinum Gothae in honour of Duke Ernest I of Saxe-Coburg-Gotha.

The new school was given a new rector, Joachim Marquardt, (1859–1882), notable for securing discipline without harsh punishments. The school grew, gaining an auditorium, new library rooms, and a gymnasium.

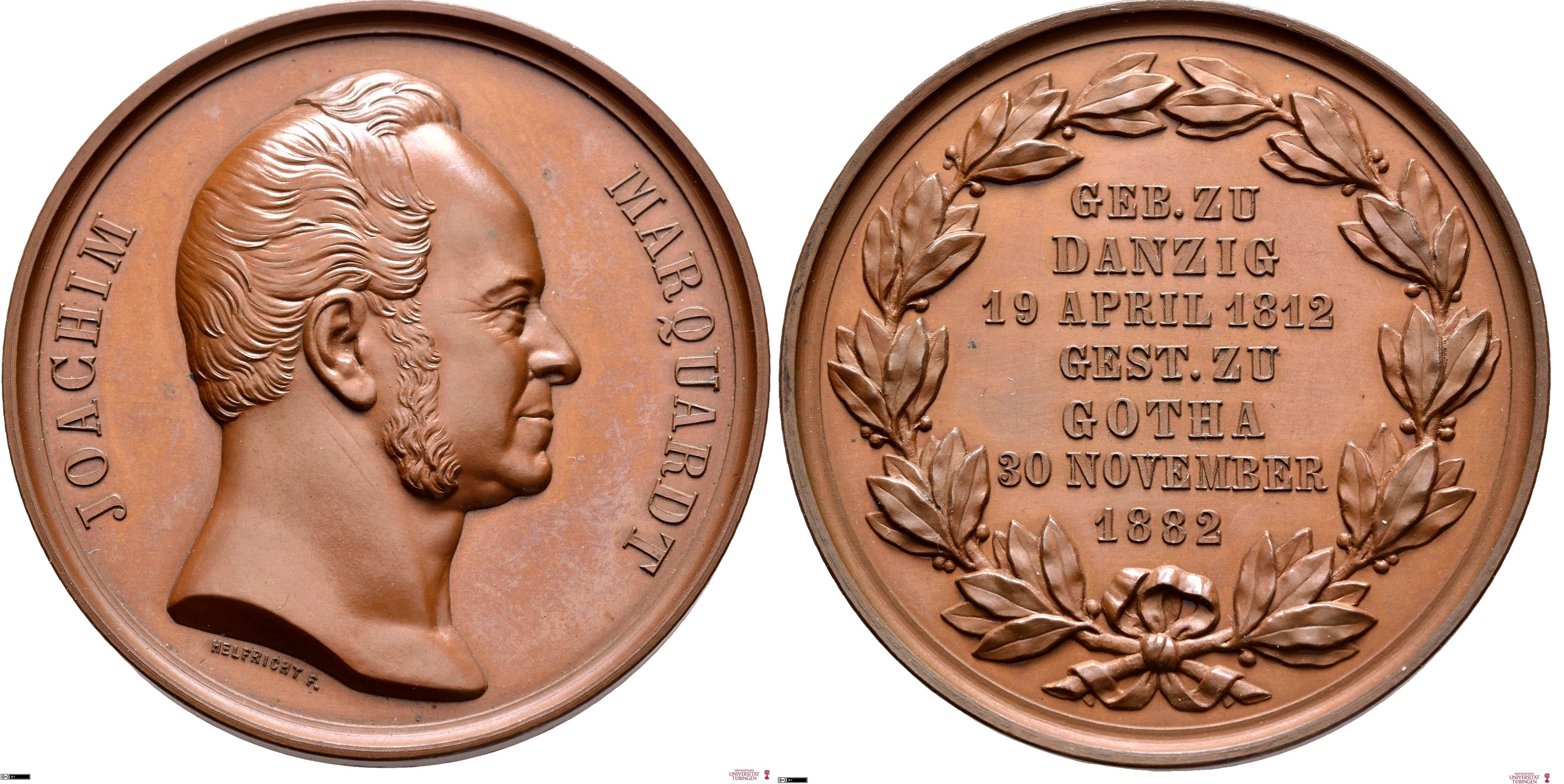
Marquardt medallion, 1883

Following Marquardt's death in 1882, the school commissioned a medallion to commemorate him, made by the local engraver Ferdinand Helfricht.

Heinrich Anz (1914–1935) continued to lead a humanistic grammar school under the Weimar Republic. A new rector, Otto Küttler (1938–1945), took the school through the Second World War, when it suffered from masters and boys departing on military service. During the war the school library was evacuated to Friedenstein Palace. The school was by then considered the oldest grammar school in the German-speaking world.

After the war, the school found itself in the Soviet occupation zone. With the introduction of a new educational system, a humanistic grammar school was no longer required. The last Abitur exams were held in the 1945/46 school year, and in the spring of 1947, the school was closed. On 10 April 1947, the boys were transferred to a school called the Arnoldischule. The former school buildings were taken over by a new middle school, and then in 1959 by a polytechnic high school, which in 1965 was named POS Albert Schweitzer.

== Refounding in 1991 ==
On 1 November 1991, following German reunification, the Ernestine Gymnasium was re-established, with Lutz Wagner as Schulleiter, or Principal, and in 1993 the first Abitur examinations took place, after a gap of 48 years. Until 1947, the school had been for boys only, but it was decided to make the newly refounded school coeducational.

== Rectors ==
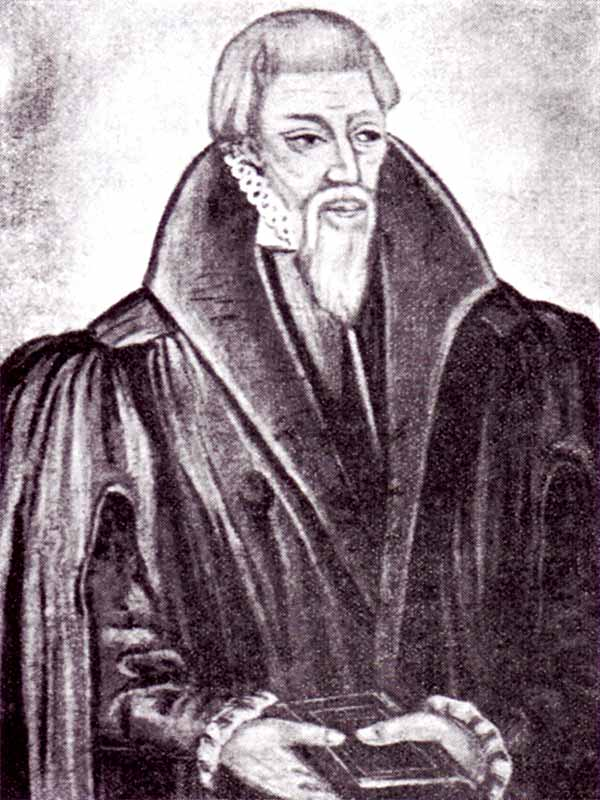
Cyriacus Lindemann

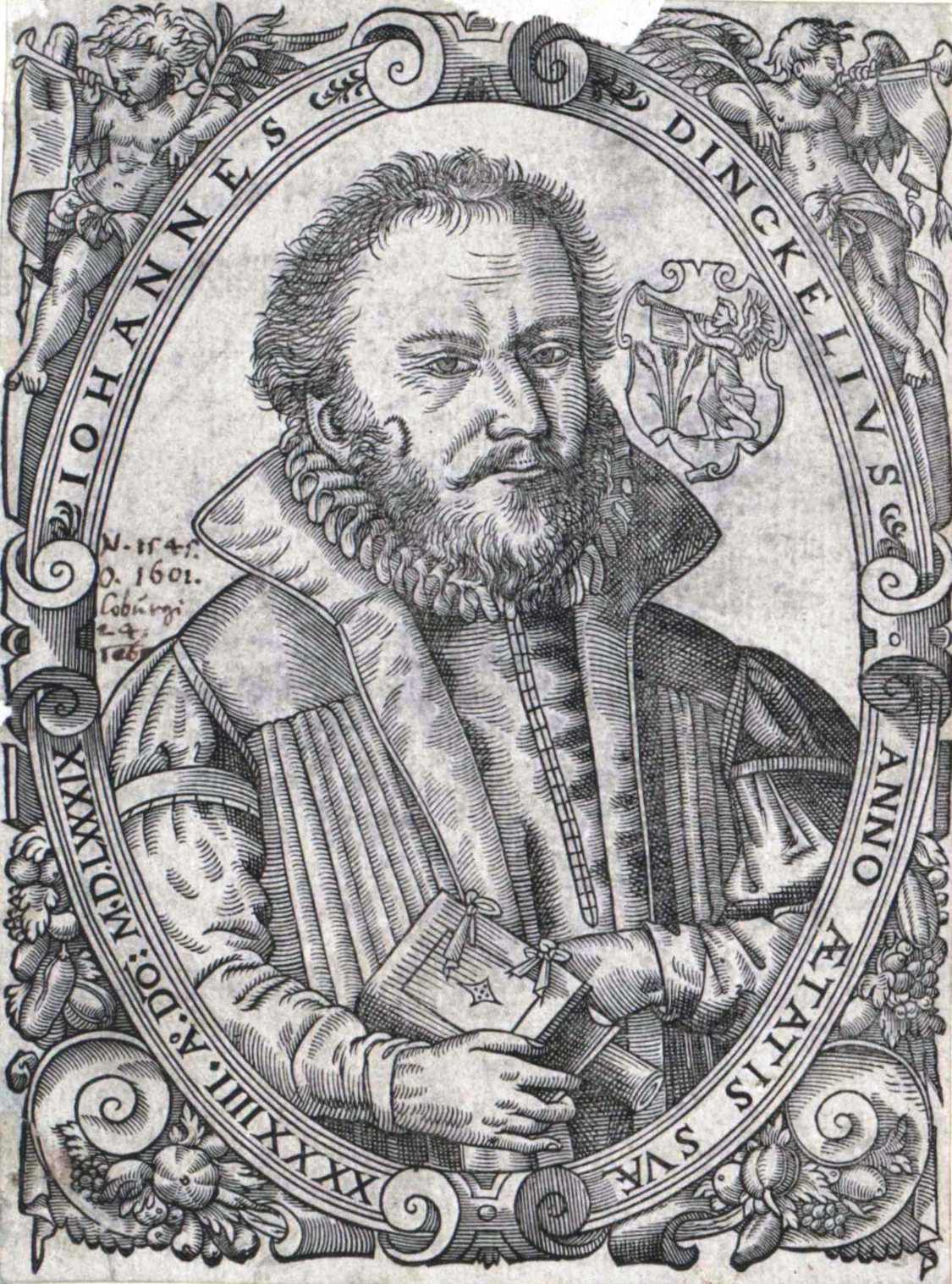
Johannes Dinckel

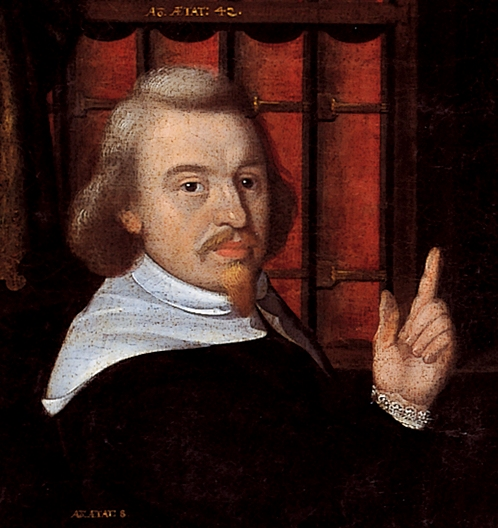
Andreas Reyher

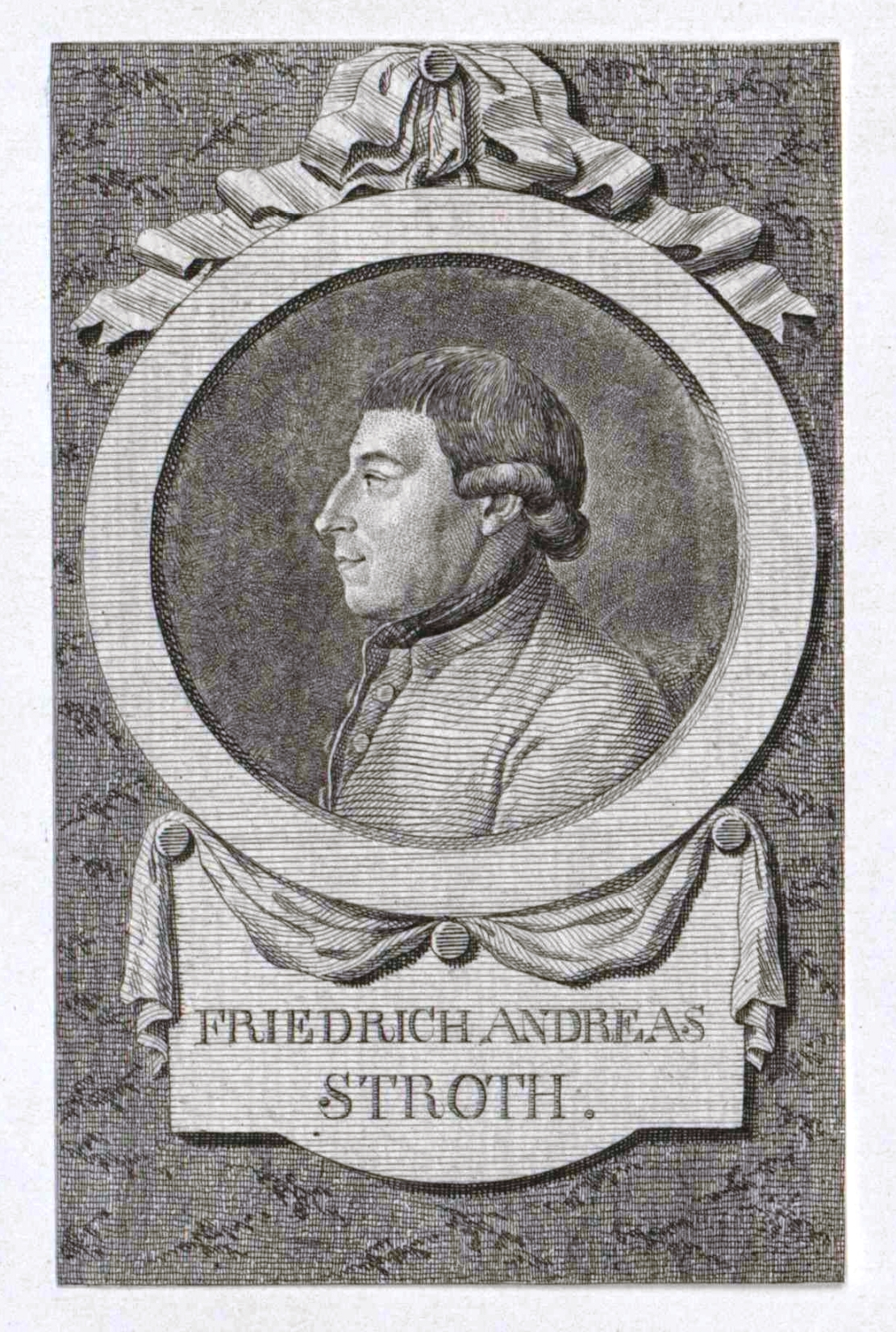
Friedrich Andreas Stroth

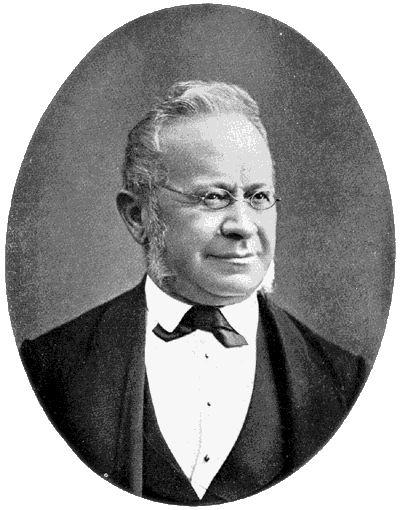
Joachim Marquardt

- Basilius Monner (1524 to 1535)
- Laurentius Schipper (1535 to 1537)
- Georg Merula (1537 to 1540)
- Pankratius Sussenbach (1540 to 1561)
- Cyriacus Lindemann (1562 to 1568)
- Paul Schmidt (1568 to 1572)
- Johann Meyer (1572 to 1580)
- Johannes Dinckel (1580 to 1582)
- Johann Helder (1582 to 1592)
- Andreas Wilke (1592 to 1631)
- Johann Weitz (1631 to 1640)
- Andreas Reyher (1641 to 1673)
- Georg Hess (1673 to 1694)
- Gottfried Vockerodt (1694 to 1727)
- Johann Heinrich Stuss (1728 to 1768)
- Johann Gottfried Geissler (1768 to 1779)
- Friedrich Andreas Stroth (1779 to 1785)
- Friedrich Wilhelm Döring (1786 to 1833)
- Ernst Friedrich Wüstemann (1833 to 1856)
- Eduard Adolf Jacobi (1833 to 1841)
- Gottfried Seebode (1838 to 1841)
- Valentin Rost (1841 to 1859)
- Joachim Marquardt (1859 to 1882)
- Eduard Wilhelm Sievers (1882 to 1883)
- Eduard Heinrich Albert von Bamberg (1883 to 1910)
- Ludwig Mackensen (1910 to 1914)
- Heinrich Anz (1914 to 1935)
- Otto Küttler (1938 to 1945)

== Principal ==
- Lutz Wagner (since 1991)

== Notable pupils ==
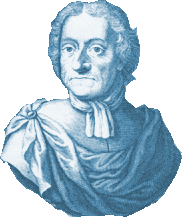
Veit von Seckendorff

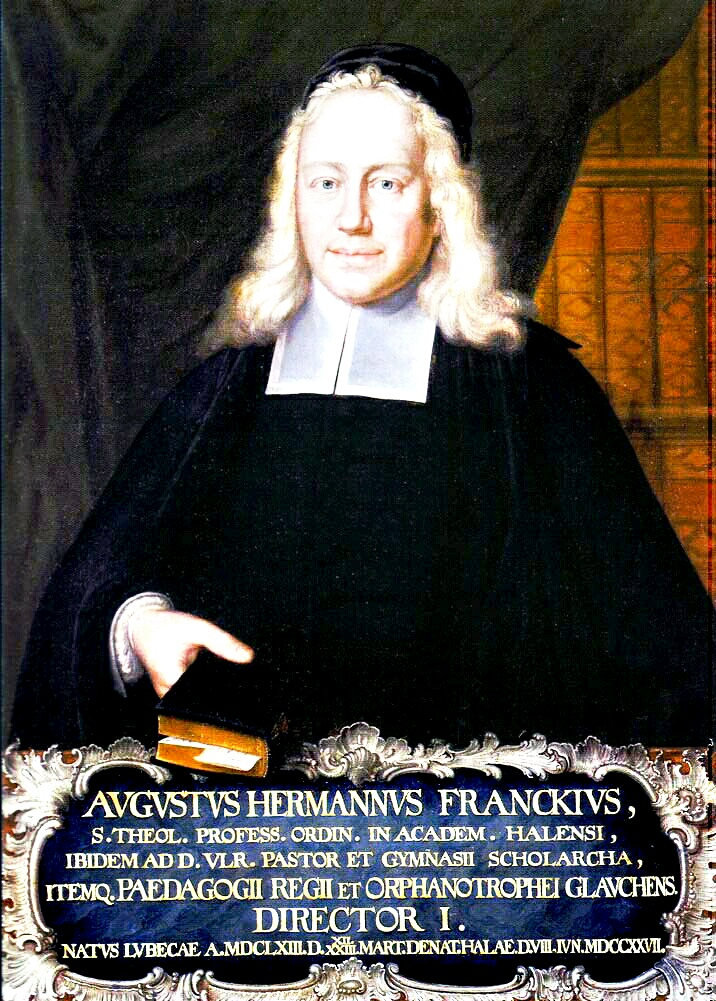
August Hermann Francke

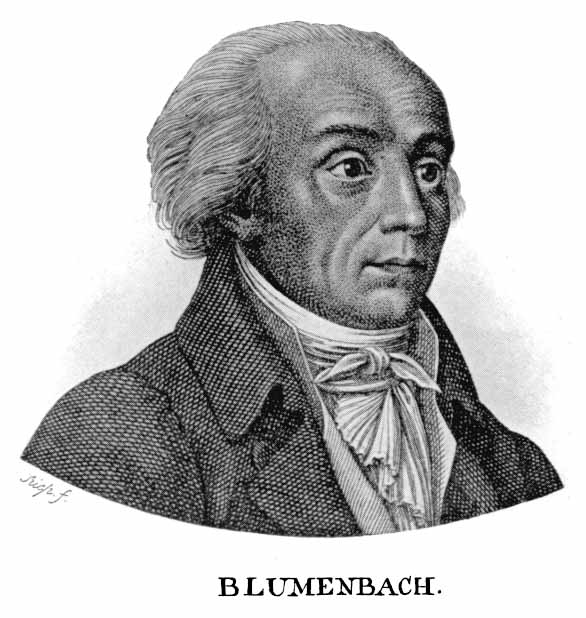
Johann Friedrich Blumenbach

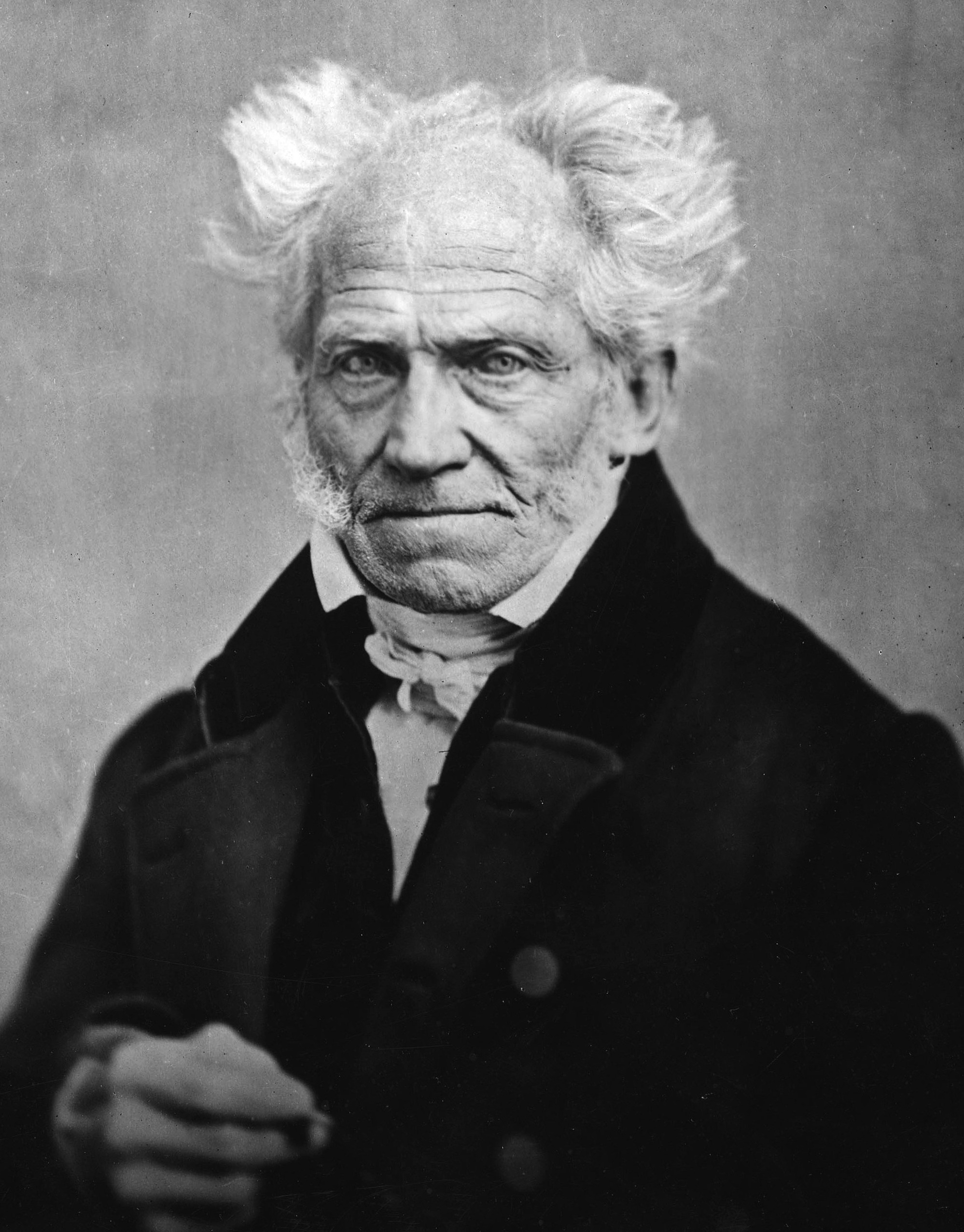
Arthur Schopenhauer

- Veit Ludwig von Seckendorff (1626–1692), attended the school from 1641 to 1642
- August Hermann Francke (1663–1727)
- Johann Friedrich Blumenbach (1752–1840), founder of the discipline of zoology, left the school in 1769
- Adolf Stieler (1775–1836), at the school 1786 to 1793, geographer
- Joseph Meyer, 1807
- Arthur Schopenhauer, 1807, expelled 1808
- Christian Ludwig Brehm, to 1808, ornithologist
- Friedrich Wilhelm Carl Umbreit (1795–1860), theologian, was at the school 1809 to 1814
- Heinrich August Wilhelm Meyer (1800–1873), theologian, left the school in 1818 with the title of primus omnium
- Raphael Kühner, to 1820
- Karl Ernst Georges, returned to the school as a schoolmaster from 1839 to 1856
- Ernst Behm, to 1849
- Christian Behrens (1852–1905), sculptor, left the school in 1870
- Hans Freiherr von Wangenheim, diplomat, German Ambassador to the Ottoman Empire 1912–1915
- Hans Dominik (1872–1945), German science fiction and non-fiction author, science journalist and engineer
- Hans Hahn (1914–1982), Second World War ace fighter pilot
- Werner Leich (born 1927), later Lutheran bishop in Thuringia, was at the school from 1939 to 1942, when he volunteered for the Luftwaffe, and again from 1945 to 1947, after the war.

== Notable staff members ==
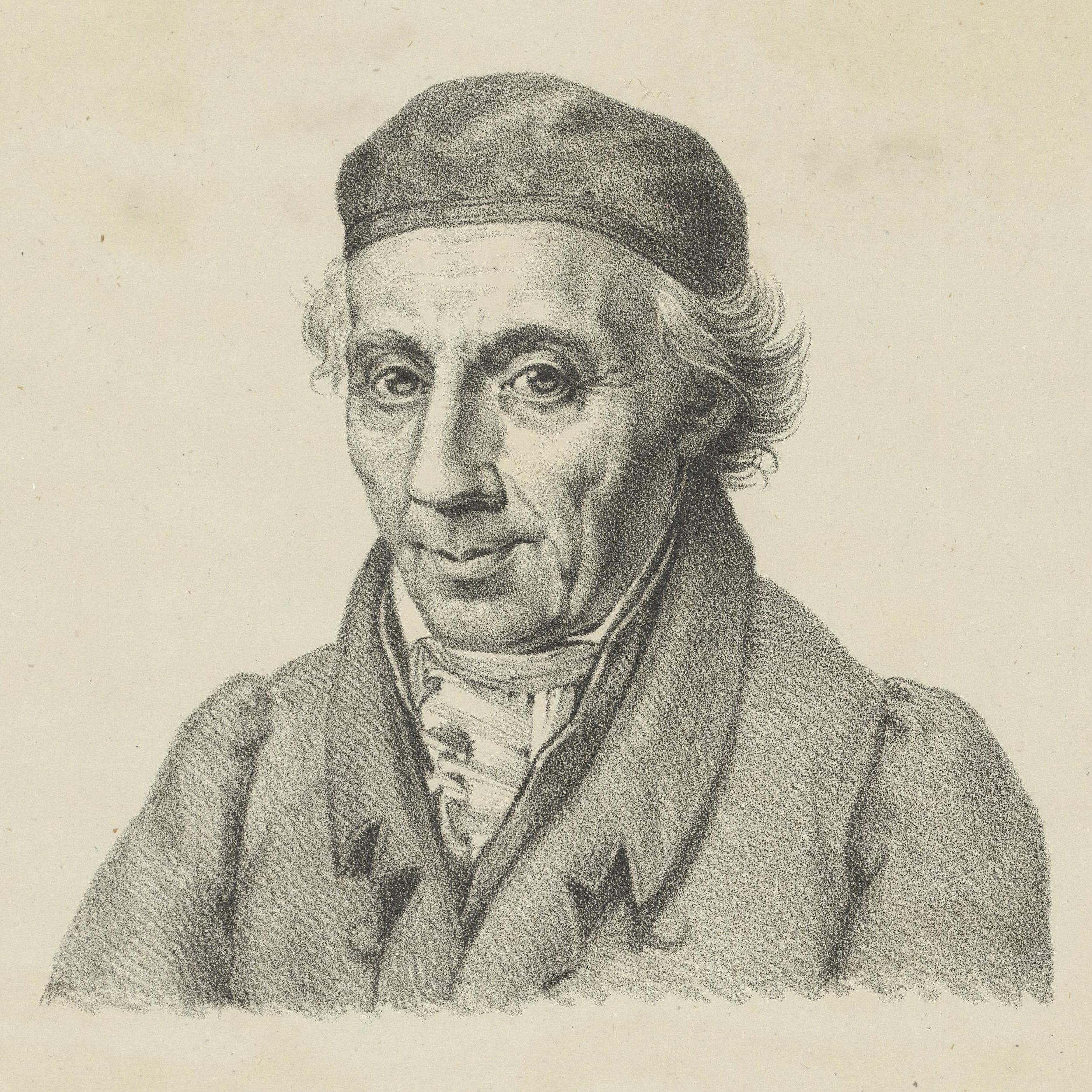
J. G. A. Galletti

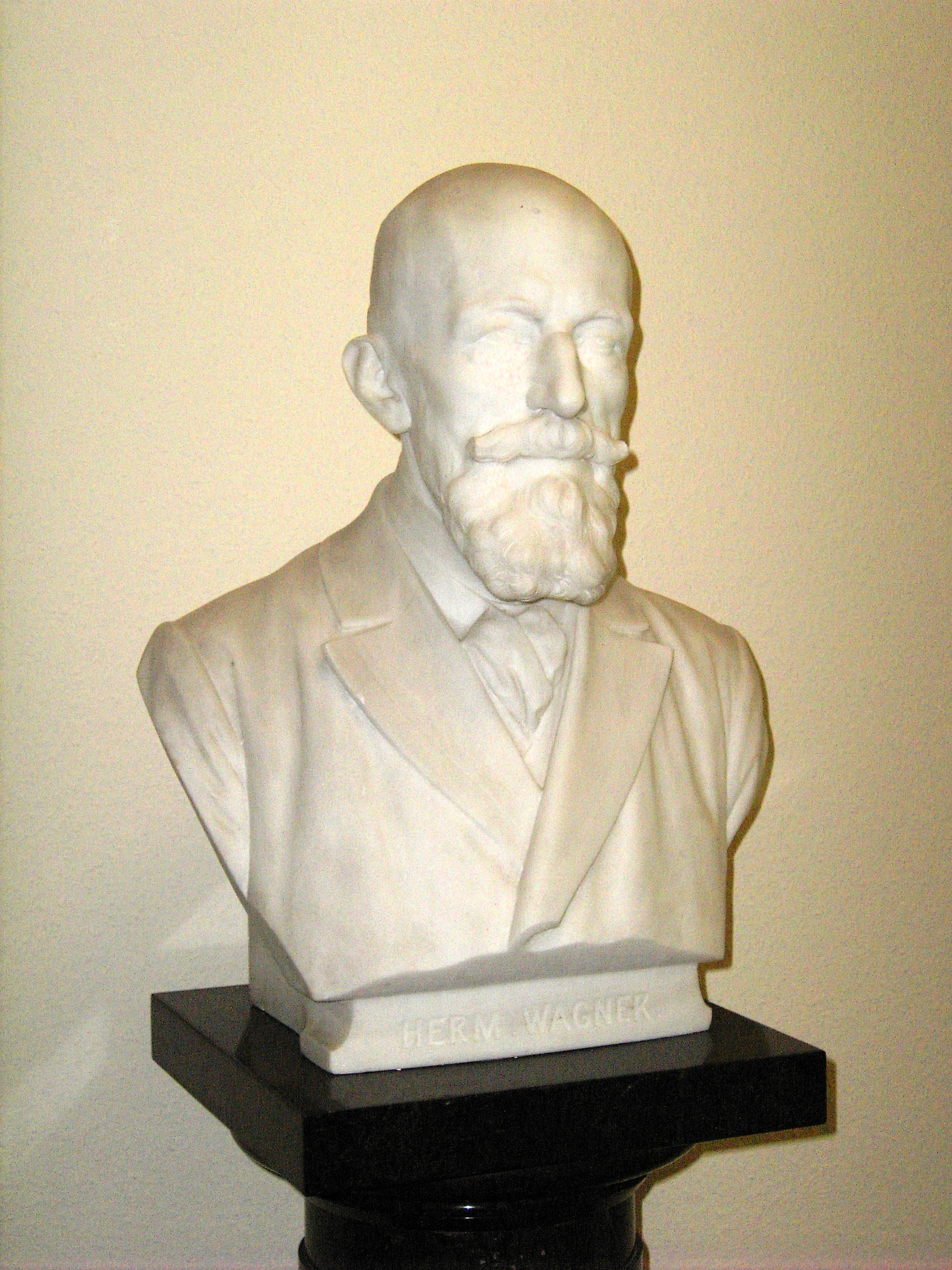
Hermann Wagner

- Johann Kaspar Friedrich Manso, 1783 to 1790, historian and philologist
- Johann Georg August Galletti, Latin master, 1778 to 1819, became famous for his whimsical sense of humour
- Friedrich August Ukert, schoolmaster from 1808
- Carl Anton Bretschneider, (1808–1878), mathematician
- Hermann Wagner (1840–1929), geographer and cartographer, taught classes in mathematics and natural history at the school from 1864 to 1876
- Kurd Lasswitz (1848–1910), schoolmaster from 1876 to 1910, teaching maths, physics, and philosophy
