= Joachim Marquardt =

German historian and writer (1812–1882)

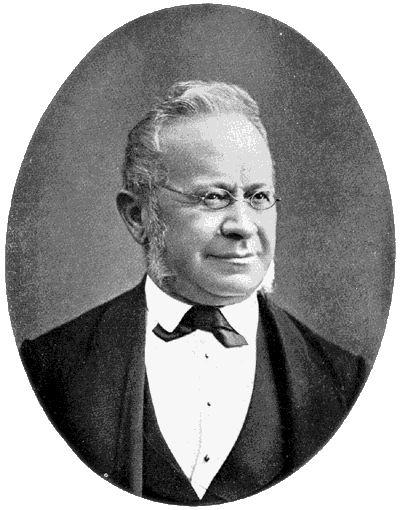
Karl Joachim Marquardt.

Karl Joachim Marquardt (19 April 1812 – 30 November 1882) was a German historian and writer on Roman antiquities.

In his later life he was Rector of the Ernestine Gymnasium, Gotha.

== Biography ==
Marquardt was born at Danzig.

He studied at Berlin and Leipzig, held various educational appointments from 1833 onwards at Berlin, Danzig, and Posen, and became in 1859 head of the gymnasium in Gotha, where he died in 1882. The dedication of his treatise Historiae equitum romanorum libri quatuor (1841) to Lachmann led to his being recommended to the publisher of Wilhelm Adolf Becker's Handbuch der römischen Alterthumer to continue the work on the death of Becker in 1846. The work took twenty years to complete, and met with such success that a new edition was soon called for. Finding himself unequal to the task single-handed, Marquardt left the preparation of the first three volumes (Römisches Staatsrecht) to Theodor Mommsen, while he himself contributed volumes V-VI (Römische Staatsverwaltung, 1873–1878) and volume VII (Das Privatleben der Römer, 1879–1882).

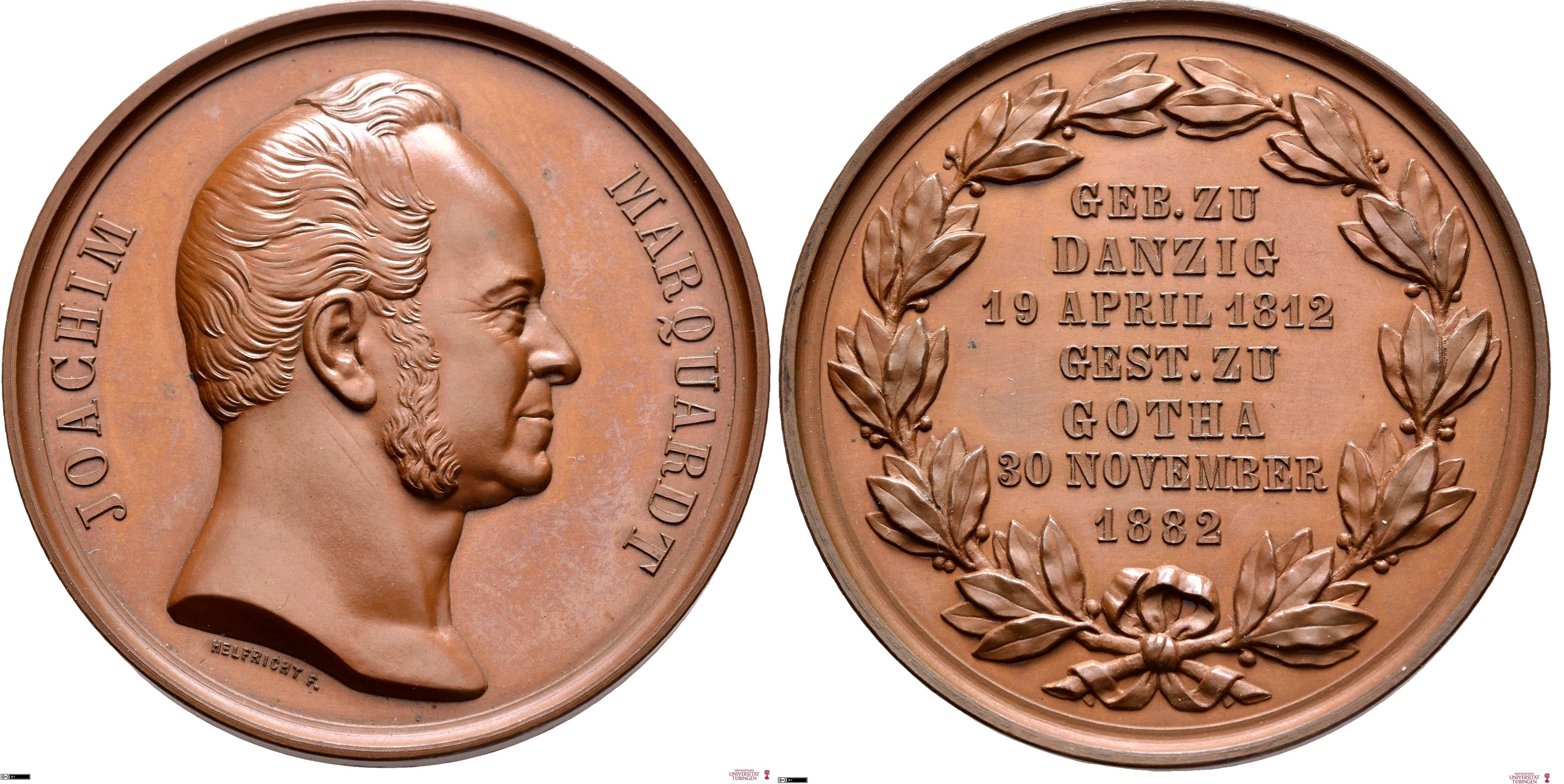
Medal Karl Joachim Marquardt 1883

Its clearness of style, systematic arrangement, and abundant references to authorities ancient and modern, continue to make it valuable to students.

Marquardt died in Gotha, while still in office as Rector of the Ernestine Gymnasium, Gotha. The school commissioned a medal to commemorate Marquardt, made by the local engraver Fredinand Helfricht and issued on November 30, 1883, the first anniversary of his death.

== Literature ==
- Kai Brodersen, Introduction in: Joachim Marquardt, Das Privatleben der Römer, new edition, Darmstadt: Wissenschaftliche Buchgesellschaft, 2016, pp. v-viii, ISBN 978-3-534-26770-5
