= Friedrich Wilhelm Carl Umbreit =

German Protestant theologian and Hebrew Bible scholar

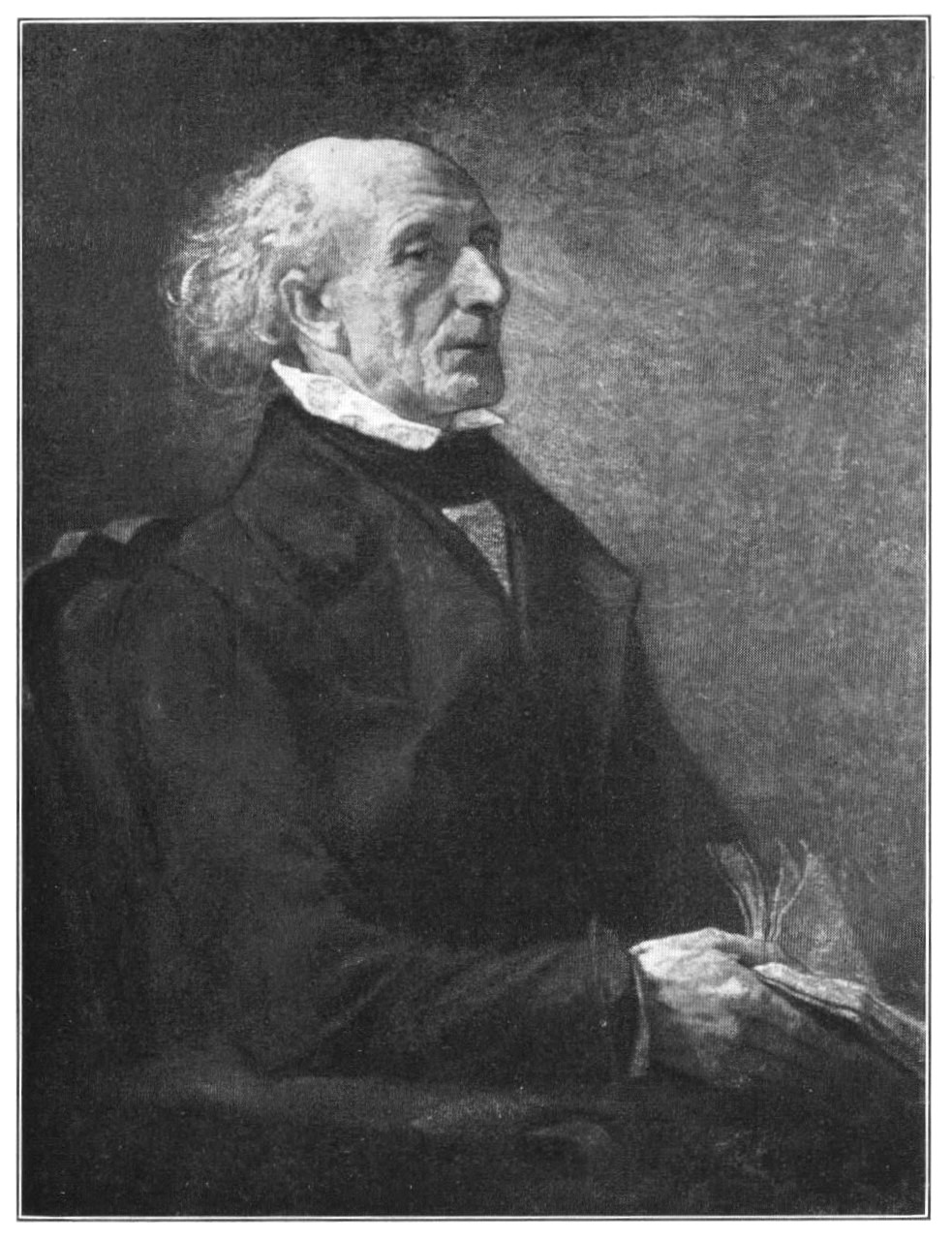
Friedrich Wilhelm Carl Umbreit (1853)

Friedrich Wilhelm Carl Umbreit (April 11, 1795, Sonneborn – April 26, 1860, Heidelberg) was a German Protestant theologian and a Hebrew Bible scholar.

== Biography ==
He was a student at the University of Göttingen, where one of his instructors was Johann Gottfried Eichhorn (1852-1827). He then continued his studies in Vienna with Orientalist Joseph von Hammer-Purgstall (1774-1856). In 1820 he became an associate professor of Old Testament studies and Oriental philology at the University of Heidelberg, where in 1823 he received the title of professor. In 1829 he attained the chair of Old Testament studies at Heidelberg.

In 1828 with Carl Christian Ullmann (1796-1865), he became co-editor of the journal Theologischen Studien und Kritiken (Theological studies and discussions). Umbreit published a scholarly translation/commentary on the Book of Job, as well as a commentary on the Book of Proverbs. His best known publication was a masterful four-volume exegetical work on the prophets of the Old Testament titled Praktischer Commentar über die Propheten des alten Bundes (1841–46).
