= Friedrich Myconius =

German Lutheran theologian and Protestant reformer

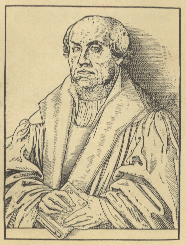
Friedrich Myconius.

Friedrich Myconius (originally named Friedrich Mekum and also Friedrich Mykonius) (26 December 1490 – 7 April 1546) was a German Lutheran theologian and Protestant reformer. He was a colleague of Martin Luther.

Myconius was born in Lichtenfels, Bavaria, and he was educated there and at Annaberg, where he had an encounter with Johann Tetzel, a Dominican, in a disagreement over indulgences. His teacher, named Staffelstein, persuaded him in 1510 to enter the Franciscan order. That same night a dream turned his thoughts towards the religious standpoint which he subsequently reached as a Lutheran. From Annaberg he passed to Franciscan communities at Leipzig and Weimar, where he was ordained priest in 1516. He had endeavoured to satisfy his mind with scholastic divinity, but next year his "eyes and ears were opened" by the theses of Luther, whom he met when Luther stopped at Weimar on his way to Augsburg.

As he became a friend and co-worker of Luther, he preached Luther's message to the people of Leipzig and Gotha, where he founded the Gotha Gymnasium. He was intimately connected with the general progress of the reforming movement, and was especially in the confidence of Luther. Twice he was entrusted with the ordering of the churches and schools in Thuringia. He took a leading part in all the religious disputations and conferences of the time, and at the 1537 Convention of Smalkald he signed the articles on his own behalf and that of his friend Justus Menius.

In 1538, Myconius was sent to England to discuss the details of the Augsburg Confession, as theologian to the embassy which hoped to induce Henry VIII to make common cause with the Lutheran reformation. Later, he wrote a history of the reformation.

In 1540 Myconius became sick and was expected to die within a short time. On his bed he wrote a loving farewell note to Luther with a trembling hand. Luther received the letter and sent back a reply: "I command thee in the name of God to live because I still have need of thee in the work of reforming the church... The Lord will never let me hear that thou art dead, but will permit thee to survive me. For this I am praying, this is my will, and may my will be done, because I seek only to glorify the name of God." Although Myconius had already lost the ability to speak when Luther's letter came, he recovered completely and lived six more years to survive Luther himself by two months. He had nine children, four of whom were living in 1542.
