= Christian Chemnitz =

German Lutheran theologian (1615-1666)

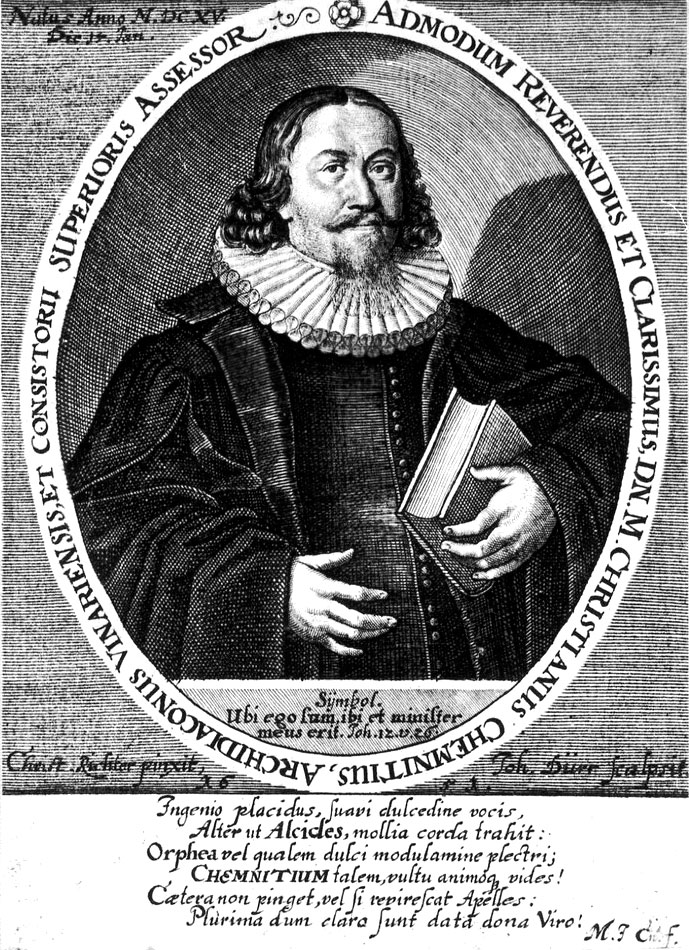
- Born: January 17, 1615; Königsfeld, Saxony
- Died: June 3, 1666 (aged 51); Jena, Saxe-Weimar
- Education: University of Leipzig; University of Jena
- Theological work
- Era: Baroque
- Language: German, Latin, Greek, Hebrew, Syriac
- Tradition or movement: Lutheranism

Christian Chemnitz (17 January 1615 – 3 June 1666) was a German Lutheran theologian.

Latin language sources identify him as Christianus Chemnitius.

== Life ==
=== Family provenance ===
Christian Chemnitz was born in Königsfeld, a small town in the hills to the south of Leipzig. The family was able to trace its origins back to Pritzwalk in Brandenburg where since 1287 they had provided no fewer than sixteen mayors and chief aldermen. The most notable family member in more recent generations was Christian's great uncle, the theologian and reformer Martin Chemnitz (1522-1586). Christian's father was another Martin Chemnitz (1564-1627), a teacher and theologian in Königsfeld where he had been appointed pastor in 1593. Christian's mother, born Dorothea Jentsch, was the daughter Johann Jentsch, mayor and town clerk of nearby Geithain. Christian Chemnitz grew up in poverty since the land was in a state of permanent crisis thanks to the Thirty Years War and the accompanying heightened plague risk and economic dislocation.

=== Early years ===
In June 1626 Christian, by now aged 11, along with his brother Christoph Chemnitz, was relocated to Zeitz, a couple of days to the west, where he attended the school. It was here that he learned of his father's death, in a plague outbreak, slightly less than a year later. In May 1632 he concluded his schooling with a farewell speech "de laudibus musices" ("in praise of music") and enrolled at the University of Leipzig. However, he was driven to leave the city by a plague outbreak and transferred to Jena where he arrived on 4 August 1633 with just 16 groschen.

=== Academic career ===
At Jena he studied under Paul Slevogt, receiving his "Baccalaurat" in 1633 and becoming, on 8 August 1637, a Master of Philosophical sciences and Theology. This opened the way to a teaching career that included the Greek, Hebrew and Syrian languages along with Logic, Physics, Metaphysics and Latin Letters. On 14 September 1638 he became Rector of the city's school.

In 1643 he moved to nearby Weimar, becoming a deacon. Promotion to the rank of archdeacon in succession to Friedrich Langen, who had died, followed in 1645. In 1647 he moved to Braunschweig, moving again in 1648 to Eisenach where he took a position as an (ecclesiastical) Superintendent. However, before long he turned his back on a career as a church administrator, returning to Jena University where, in 1652, he received his habilitation (higher academic qualification) and became a part-time teacher in Theology ("Gottesgelehrtheit"), at the same time taking a post as university vice-superintendent. On 13 August 1653 he became a doctor of holy scripture. A series of further university promotions rapidly followed.

On his appointment as vice-superintendent, Chemnitz became deputy to a man in his late eighties. In January 1654 Johannes Major died, following which Chemnitz took over his role as superintendent, also taking on the full professorship / teaching chair at the Theology faculty. He also took his share of administrative responsibilities, several times serving as Dean of Faculty. He also served two terms as university rector. The office holder was switched twice a year, and Christian Chemnitz held the position during the winter terms of 1655/56 and 1659/60.

Christian Chemnitz died in Jena.

== Evaluation ==
In terms of what later emerged as mainstream Lutheranism, Chemnitz's biblical and confessional approach represented a relatively mild form of seventeenth century orthodoxy. Even if his exegetic, dogmatic and devotional contributions have been subsequently superseded, they remain valuable as representative of their times.

== Family ==
Christian Chemnitz was married twice.

His first marriage was to Christina Kiesenhöfer (1620-1657), daughter of the Jena businessman Johann Kiesenhöfer. This marriage resulted in ten recorded children, although seven of these died before reaching their first birthdays, and only two made it to adulthood. Christina never recovered from the birth of her final son, dying eleven days later. His second marriage was to Maria Gerhard. She was by this stage the widow of the former Gotha court physician, Dr. Johann Volck. Maria was also daughter to the noted Lutheran theologian Johann Gerhard. This second marriage resulted in one recorded daughter. This meant that three of Chemnitz's children survived to adulthood:

- Eva Chemnitz (born Jena, 1642: died Eisenberg 1703) married firstly 1622 Johann Friedrich Gerhard, Eisenberg superintendent: she married secondly Matthias Jessen.
- Samuel Chemnitz (born Weimar, 1652); qualified as a doctor of medicine at Jena in or before 1677.
- Sophia Susanna Chemnitz (born Jena, 1659: died 1722) married firstly 1681 Johannes Probst, financier and son of Zwenkau pastor Johann Probst: she married secondly Peter Provonsal, Languages teacher.

== Output (selection) ==
- In me intuens pius esto, Predigten von der Sündfluth. Jena 1645
- Göttliches vergiß mein nicht, oder Predigt von den 4. letzten Dingen. Weimar 1649, Jena 1664
- Historiam Josephi in CX. Predigten. Erfurt 1653
- Introductionem in Latinitatem. Erfurt 1653
- Collegium Epistolicum Latinum. Leipzig 1654, Jena 1658
- Breve Examen der Ursachen, welche D. Schefflern zum Abfall zur Röm. Kirche bewogen. Jena 1655
- Veritatem Religionis Lutheranae defensam. Jena 1655
- Collegium Disputatorium super Epist. ad Galat. Jena 1656
- Disput. inaug. de Problemate: An Lutherani et Caluiniani in fundamentalibus fidei Articulis consentiant, quod negatur. Jena 1657
- De Persona Jesu Christi. Jena 1657
- Disp. inaug. de tentationibus spiritual. Jena 1657 (Präside: Johann Tobias Major)
- Disp. IV. de arbore vitae. Jena 1657
- Methodum concionandi. Jena 1658, 1666
- De arbore scientiae boni et mali. Jena 1659
- De. S. Angelis. Jena 1661
- Breuem instructionem futuri Ministri Eccelsiae. Jena 1661
- Collegium Theologicum super Formulam Concord. Jena 1661
- Ermahnungs- und Warnungs-Predigt Dom. VII. Trin. 1660. samt Fürstl. Befehlen. Jena 1661
- Disp. inaug. de vera ac reali praesentia corporis et sanguinis Christi in Coena. Jena 1662 (Resp. Johann Friedrich Gerhard)
- Responsionem pro Gerhardo contra Vorstium. Jena 1663
- Disp. Theologicam de Fide Daemonum. Jena 1663
- Ulteriorem defensionem Dissert. IV. Jena 1664
- Bericht und Antwort auf D. Schefflers Türcken-Schrift, auch Nach-Schrifft. Jena 1664
- Bericht und Antwort auf D. Schefflers Kehrwisch. Jena 1664
- Bericht und Antwort auf D. Schefflers Traum- und Triumph etc. Jena 1664
- Predigten de Extremo Judicio, Inferno etc. Jena 1664
- Verthädigter Grund des Glaubens und Seeliigkeit etc. oder Bericht auf Henr. Mart. Eccardi Bedencken über das Theolog. Gespräch 1661 zu Cassel etc. Jena 1664
- Exercitationem de Esaui salute. Jena 1665
- Dissert. de Persona et Libro Hiobi. Jena 1665
- De sensu Scripturae S.. Jena 1665
- Danck-Valet- und Gedächtnüs-Predigt. Jena
- Diss. de salute Salomonis. Jena 1666
- Disp. de tentatione sensus et inexistentiae fidei. Jena 1666
- Praelectiones Hutteri Compendium. Jena 1670
- Jenisches Hand-Buch von D. Gerharden zusammengetragen. Jena 1674, 1687
- Ermahnungs- und Wahrnehmungs-Predigt, dabey der Bericht vom Jenischen Tumult. Jena 1677
- Investitur-Predigt. Jena
