= Paul Slevogt =

German philologist and Aristotelian philosopher (1596-1655)

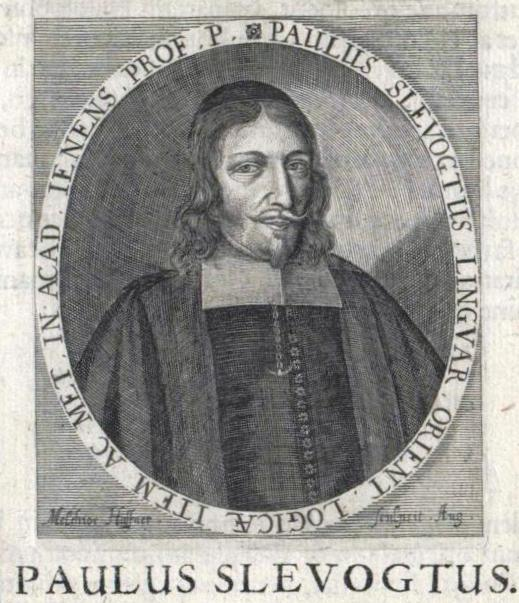

Paul Slevogt (29 April 1596 - 22 June 1655) was a German philologist and Aristotelian philosopher.

== Biography ==
Paul Slevogt was born in Possendorf, a small town in central southern Germany which more recently, in 1994, was subsumed into Weimar. He was educated at a succession of schools in the area and then, in 1615, enrolled at the nearby University of Jena. He emerged five years later with a Magister degree and immediately started teaching. In 1621 he moved to Braunschweig where he became "Konrektor" (loosely, "deputy head") at the town's secondary school ("Gymnasium"). The virtuosity he displayed with his Latin verse won him plaudits and at least one important prize as a poet. Nevertheless, after three years he moved back south to the University of Jena where he remained for the rest of his career. In 1625 he accepted a professorship in Hebrew and Greek. He was also offered a professorship in Theology, which he turned down. He nevertheless took part in the Church Visitation of 1650.

Slevogt took his share of administrative responsibilities at Jena, serving at various times as dean of the philosophy faculty and also serving three summer terms, in 1633, 1643 and again 1649, as the University Rector.

Daniel Stahl, the Jena professor of Logic and Metaphysics died in May 1654. Slevogt was given the opportunity to take over that professorship. However, he himself suffered a stroke in August 1654, and after failing to make a full recovery died following a further stroke in June 1655. His body was buried at St. Michael's, the principal Protestant church in Jena.

== Family ==
Paul Slevogt was married twice. His first marriage took place at Jena in 1627 and was to Ursula Freyer (1608-1636)), the daughter of a leading Jena syndic, Wolfgang Freyer (1578-1634)) and his wife, born Ursula Hübner (1585-1612), who as the daughter of a former mayor also came from a prominent family. Paul Slevogt's second marriage took place in 1640, also at Jena, and was to Barbara Catharina Ringler (1621-1695), the daughter of a judge.

The first marriage resulted in the births of at least six children, of whom at least three survived to adulthood. The second marriage produced at least a further six children of whom four survived to adulthood.

Two of the children from the second marriage achieved a measure of notability:

- Johann Philipp Slevogt (1649-1727) became a law professor.
- Johann Adrian Slevogt (1653-1726) became a physician.
