= Kingdom of Mamba =

Former Chagga Kingdom in Kilimanjaro 1700s-1912

Kingdom of Mamba Isarile ya Mamba (Kimmamba)
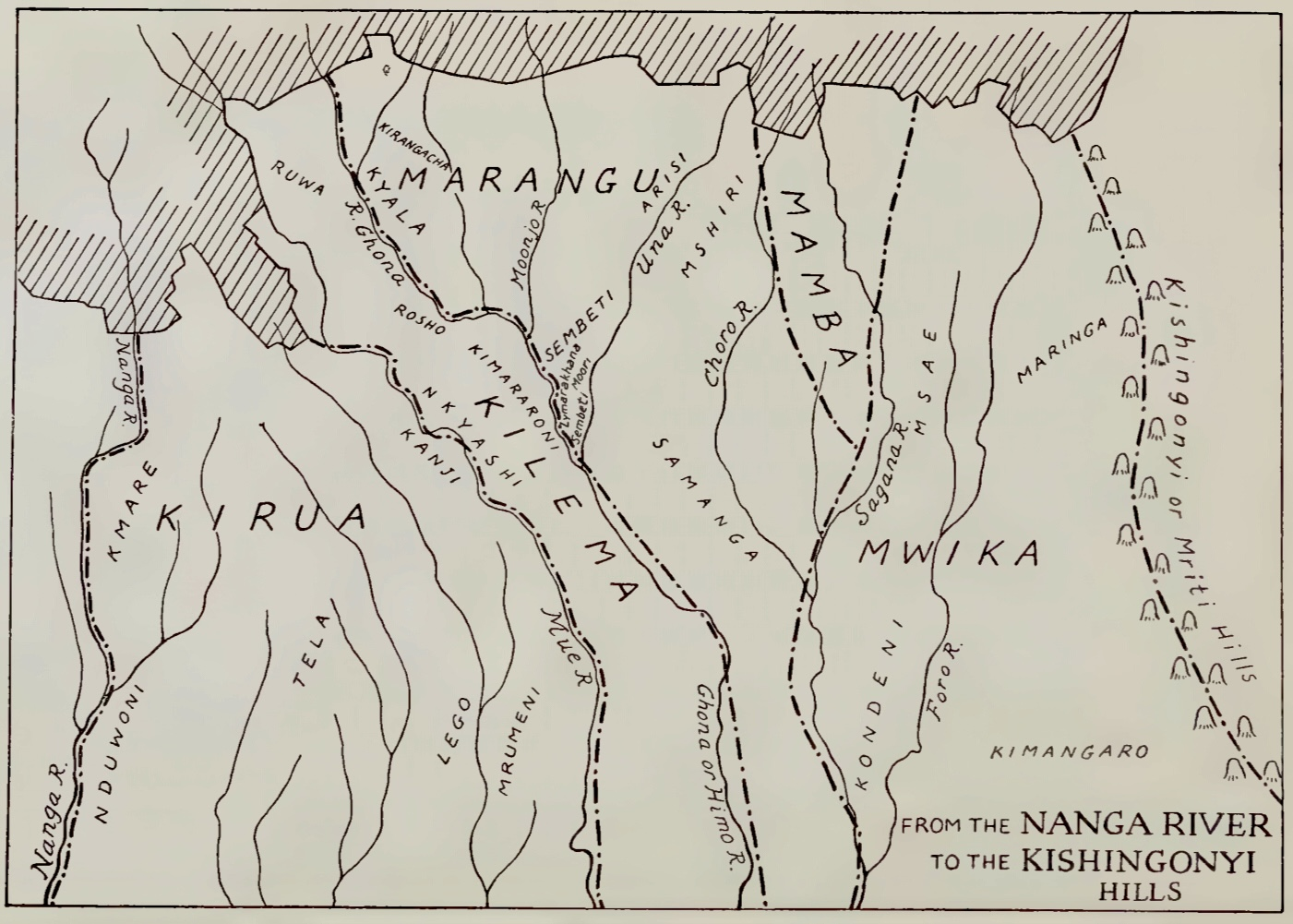
- Map of Kirua, Kilema, Marangu, Mamba and Mwika kingdoms after their unifications c.1950s
- Status: Kingdom
- Common languages: Official language Kimwika Unofficial minority languages Chagga, Swahili,Pare,Shambaa
- Religion: African Traditional; Islam; Lutherans
- Government: Monarchy
- Mangi (King)
  - c.1750s: Mangi Mafaluke of the Niange Clan
  - c.1780s -1840s: Queen Mashina of Mamba (Wife of Mafaluke))
  - c.late 1800s: Mangi Rongoma
  - c.1880s-1912: Mangi Mlawi
  - c.1890s-1912: Mangi Marealle
- Historical era: Pre-colonial era; Scramble for Africa; World War I World War II; Post-colonial era

Population
  - 1880s: ~1,000
  - 1950s: ~2,000
- Currency: Zanzibari rupee; Goldmark (1873–1914); East African shilling (after 1918)
Preceded by	Succeeded by
Chagga Chiefdoms	Tanganyika
- Today part of: Tanzania
- Area and population not including colonial possessions

- Person: Mmamba
- People: Wamamab
- Language: Kimamba
- Country: Umammba

Mamba or Kingdom of Mamba also sometimes referred to as Mamba Vunjo (Isarile la Mamba in Kivunjo), (Ufalme wa Mamba in Swahili) was located the area of Vunjo. Mamba was once a small but powerful sovereign Chagga state in Moshi Rural District of Kilimanjaro Region in Tanzania.

== Overview ==
Among the other sovereign states, Mamba is one of the tiniest kingdoms. We were positioned to the east, between the Choro and Sagana rivers, and it was near the Marangu forest boundary area to the west. Machina of Mamba, a female sovereign leader, was the only one to rule a portion of the Chagga states. In the late eighteenth century, she controlled Mamba independently despite power and influence from Mangi Orombo.

Because of its might and closeness to Marangu, Mangi Marealle is particularly interested in undermining the Mamba kingdom in the 1890s.⁣

== History ==
Under two important leaders, Mafaluke of the royal Niange clan and his widow Mashina, who held the position of queen after his death, Mamba reached its zenith in the late 18th century. Together with Kibosho, Mafaluke led successful raids in the Kishingonyi highlands and Vunjo. Mashina skilfully and mysteriously kept Mafaluke's realms intact after his death till her own death. Following this affluent time, Mamba had a downturn, but Mangi Sina of Kibosho brought it back to life in the late 19th century by appointing Mangi Mlawi, a descendant of Mafaluke.⁣

Mamba persisted as a hub for craftsmen who exchanged iron for cattle in spite of their downfall. They supported local monarchs, including Mangi Sina, who depended on Mamba for weapons, starting in the 1870s, by producing costly goods like spears and necklaces. Mamba was able to obtain favourable treatment from their conquerors, particularly the Warusha, thanks to their tenacity.⁣

=== Queen Mashina and Mangi Rongoma's influence ===
Mangi Rongoma had grown strong enough to take on Mashina, the acting queen of Mamba, who was a more formidable foe. Despite his numerous attacks, he was always beaten by Mamba. After a while, he deceived Mashina into visiting him in Kilema, where she lived as one of his wives, by posing as a friend. Rongoma has a straw-covered secret pit inside her hut. Mashina suffocated after falling into the trap without realising it. Following her death, Rongoma seized power in Mamba and expanded her authority over the nearby areas of Msae and Mwika (Kimangaro), which had previously been ruled by Mashina. Throughout the Kishingonyi highlands, Rongoma's supremacy was unchallenged at the height of his authority.

Queen Mashina of Mamba had been overthrown as the most powerful monarch in Vunjo by Mangi Rongoma, who expanded his sphere of influence from the Nanga River to the Kishingonyi hills, outstripping her territory, which ended short of Kilema and Kirua. However, because the more powerful Mangi Orombo of Keni dominated regions to the east, Rongoma and Mashina's aspirations came to an end at the Kishingonyi highlands. Rongoma sought and obtained an agreement with Orombo, much as Mashina had done before her, reaffirming his own position west of the highlands. Like a previous agreement with Mashina, this alliance was short-lived, and Orombo maintained the arrangement's superior authority.

Oral histories state that Rongoma died violently in his middle years. The curses that Silawe of Marangu and Queen Mashina of Mamba, whom he had killed, were said to have caused his death. When a Marangu man mixed poison into his tobacco, he was poisoned to death. For two years, Rongoma's death remained concealed in the hut of his elderly wife, Malima.⁣

Under Mlawi, Mamba was the second-ranking kingdom in Vunjo by the early 1880s, after Kilema. In contrast to Mamba, Kilema's strength was derived from its established chieftaincy, which showed a remarkable capacity to withstand hardships without disintegrating. ⁣

== See also ==
- Chagga states
- Machame
- Kingdom of Masama
- Kibosho
- Old Moshi
- Siha
- Kingdom of Mbokomu
