= Rengua =

- Mangi of Machame, Kilimanjaro
- Reign: 1808–1837
- Predecessor: Mangi Kombe II
- Successor: Mamkinga of Machame
- Born: 1784; Foo, Machame, Hai District, Kilimanjaro Region
- Died: 1837 (aged 52–53); Machame, Hai District, Kilimanjaro Region.
- Burial: 1840s Foo, Machame
- Spouses: Mamboiyo, and others.
- Issue (among others): Kishong'u; Samanya; Mamkinga; Kileo; Meenda (the elder); Kiwera; Meenda (the younger)
Names
- Rengua Kombe
- Dynasty: Kombe
- Father: Kombe Mdu (Kombe II)
- Religion: Traditional African religions

Rengua or Mangi Rengua Kombe Kiwaria (1784–1837), also known as Mangi Rengua of Machame (Mangi Rengua in Kichagga; (Mfalme Rengua in Swahili) was a king of the Chaga in Machame, a major sovereign Chagga states in the early 1800s. Mangi means king in Kichagga. Rengua's great great grandfather, Ntemi, established the Machame chiefdom, after a split from Sieny settlement, across river Kikafu. It was his eldest son, Kombe, famously known as Kombe Msu (or Kombe I), that later founded the Kombe dynasty, which ruled until the 1960s, including through turbulent political times in the western Chaga history and bitterly competing Chaga states. Rengua, however, was the one that consolidated Machame as one of the most powerful kingdoms in Chaggaland and is considered one of the greatest leaders in Machame history and a major inspirator of later chagga politics that dominated in the mid to later part of the 19th century. He is also known for massacring Kibosho initiates at Kimbushi, around Makoa area, in Machame, prompting the rivalry between Kibosho and Machame.

== Early life and rise to power ==
Rengua was born to Mangi Kombe II, son of Kiwaria, a great warrior in the late 1790s in Machame. Bruno Gutmann, a German missionary who lived in Masama-Machame in the early 1900s, notes that Kiwaria had been ridiculed because he only had daughters. He later got a son whom he sent to the Waroo on Mount Meru to the west of Kilimanjaro, dressed as a girl. He developed there into a warrior and eventually went back home to Machame.

Rengua's rise and reign can be traced to the first half of the 19th century, most likely to between 1810 and late 1830s. Johannine Rebmann, a missionary turned an explorer, reports in his diary that, by 1849, Mamkinga Rengua, who took power after his father's death, had a Swahili magician in his court, named Nasser, who told Rebmann that he had been living there for six years, meaning since 1843. However, this does not necessarily tell us of the year that Mamkinga became the king of Machame instead, it informs us that as of 1843 Mamkinga was a ruler already of Machame.

Rebmann's accompanying Swahili guide, a Zigua named Bwana Kheri, had personally seen a frost-bitten survivor of Mangi Rengua's silver mission, meaning that the event had not happened many years back.

Rengua was unique in that he lay the groundwork for what would eventually grow to be the most powerful dynasty in the entire Kikafu basin for generations to come. Going forward, what happened in Foo had an impact on the others. The Kombe clan and other groups of other clans engaged in a long-lasting, vicious fight for dominance that eventually spilled over and plunged the entire region into civil wars.

A new era began with the appearance of Rengua. He was the first of his dynasty to be successful in elevating himself above all others in Foo, becoming the acknowledged head of not only his clan but also the nearby Lema and Nkya clans. The establishment of kingship in the area immediately east of the Kikafu was sparked by this humble beginning. It began by being similar to the concurrent development of independent leaders, some of whom had the rank of mangi, in various areas of the region to the west of the river.

Due to the gift of an iron spear, which provided him a tactical edge over his rivals in the Kikafu basin region who were unaware of such a weapon, Rengua rose to prominence. According to legend, Rengua was horrified to see the blood of the first man he murdered with this spear and, after ordering a fat goat to be cut, he gave one of his kids the name "Kishongu," or "Skin Ring," as a token of atonement for his deed.

Throughout Kilimanjaro, the "Kishongu" ceremony is common and is still carried out today. As a sign that neither man will remember the animosity, if two men fight, they kill a goat and drink the blood together. Then, each man chops a piece of meat and gives it to the other. Finally, each man fashions a piece of skin into a ring and places it on the finger of the other.

This practice can be compared to two ancient, now-extinct customs as an act of atonement for the spilling of human blood: taking a small amount of the victim's blood and either drinking it, as in Kibosho, or rubbing it on oneself, as in the chiefdoms of Rombo, to live in the afterlife not in enmity with him but as his blood-brother.

When the other strong competitor leaders in the Kombe, Lema, and Nkya clans saw Rengua with the spear, they were terrified and submitted to his authority. So Rengua changed into Mangi of Foo. Later, he learned how to wield iron spears and taught them to his supporters before being elected as the first Mangi of Machame and taking control of the Kikafu basin.

In the minds of his own and following generations, the Machame people gave Rengua's spear the power of black magic. But it's not entirely obvious where it came from. According to current oral traditions in Machame, Rengua discovered from hunting parties that a Masai tribe known as Wakuavi was wandering the plain, that they possessed cattle and iron, that they were highly skilled fighters, and that they had defeated the Pare people. They also told Rengua that they had iron. The only weapons the Machame people possessed were wooden sticks and wooden bows and arrows, so Rengua sent an agent from the Swai clan named Kyaama to them, who later returned bearing a spear as a present.

As a result, Rengua made contact with the Maasai, supposedly Wakuavi, who was then residing on the plains below Roo. He obtained spears for himself and later imported the knowledge necessary to make them. The club, which was previously unknown in Machame, is added to the gift of the original spear handed to Rengua by the oral tradition. This club was given by Rengua to the warrior in charge of his raids. Both items were allegedly given special treatment by the Maasai, which gave them both black magic abilities.

This still leaves the origin of the gift up for debate, as the Masai treatment might equally refer to people living in the plains or the Orio clan, which is said to have descended from the Maasai. As was customary for the mangi to do in other sections of Kilimanjaro, Rengua maintained strict control over the spears. The blacksmiths operated covertly and gave Rengua the spears so he could distribute them to the masumba. The masumba, residents who were wealthy, powerful, and essentially independent, as well as all the adult males, used to accompany him on his raids. While his brother Mwara, a tremendously skilled warrior, frequently led the raids, he occasionally took the lead alone.

The Swai clan claims Mwara as a member of their clan and claims that he was responsible for getting the spears from the Maasai (Wakuavi) in Roo and giving them to Rengua, although Mwara is typically thought of as Rengua's brother. From Foo, the rest of the Kikafu basin region was the easy pickings; it was less fortified with iron spears and more cattle-rich than Rengua's realm. He eliminated the cattle from the nation by raiding west of the Kikafu. He took some and left the rest to be sold off for the benefit of himself and his top lieutenants.

In Kilimanjaro, it is common to see livestock being farmed out in a remote area; this indicates that one region of the country is rising while the other is falling. Rengua's warriors would have rarely traded dry bananas, eleusine flour, and honey for meat and milk with the Wakuavi in Roo had the eastern Kikafu basin region (Foo, etc.) been richer in cattle before this period. His ascendancy increased when he traveled further west, past the Kikafu basin proper, to the nearby little nations of Nguni and Kyuu, whose citizens came from very diverse backgrounds.

The leaders of the Nkya clan in Sonu, the Mboro clan in Masama, the Nathai clan in Nguni, and the Munuo clan in Kyuu were to help him when he raided his neighbors to the east, the Kibosho people, who were more formidable because they knew how to use weapons and were extremely wealthy in cattle. Eventually, he made treaties with the masumba of the four old settled places west of the Kikafu. From that point on, he raided with these masumba from the west, and after each raid, they divided the cattle, with Rengua receiving a larger portion.

== Rengua's massacre of the Kibosho initiates ==
Then Rengua attempted to use his spears against the Kibosho, starting the process that would ultimately lead to his success and later notoriety. His first action not only set the stage for his subsequent successes but also for repercussions that would linger for more than a century.

The Orio clan, the royal main clan of Kibosho, had already arrived at that point in a sizable company traveling eastward through the high savanna above the forest line from the west. They had stopped en route at a town called Kimbushi, which was located within the next major river system, the Weru Weru, between the tributary Warumu and the Weru Weru itself, a few miles east of the river Makoa, the eastern border of the Kikafu basin enclave.

They then descended along the Weru Weru's west bank. They had settled at Owaa in Lyamungo on the eastern bank of the river after fording the large ravine at the river's only fordable point. From there, others traveled even further east to the region that would eventually become the Kibosho chiefdom's center. Part of the Orio clan, including the dominant figure Kirenga and his son and successor Kashenge, were residing on the expansive flat open territory at Owaa in that region of Lyamungo in present-day Machame Mashariki below the river crossing at the time of Rengua's initial raid. The word Lyamungo means "flat land."

The time had come for the ruler's and his men's sons to be circumcised and initiated. All the young men were afterward dispatched over the Weru Weru and up to Kimbushi, a swampy area beneath the sounding pond Marushu that was chosen for the ritual because it was revered by the Orio clan as a resting place for the ancestors. This group of young lads was the target of Rengua's assault. They were playing together at Kimbushi two days after circumcision as a warm-up to initiation when Rengua and his warriors charged them, killing them all.

The massacre of the Kibosho initiates is the name given to this act. Today, it is remembered with a particular terror; it was a deed unmatched on Kilimanjaro. The killing of foes in the past was considered part of the day's labor by the Chagga nowadays, but the Machame and Kibosho people still sing ancient depressing songs in remembrance of this particular event, which they find too disturbing. Even though the episode occurred more than a century ago, it is one of those uncommon occurrences that men recall with tears in the history of the countries of Kilimanjaro, numbering possibly less than ten in total.

Because of this, the Kibosho deeply feared Rengua. He owned all the animals, men, and women of Kibosho after the conquest. He forced the return of numerous people as slaves to Machame. All livestock and goats discovered in any Kibosho home were seized, and their owner was instructed to take care of them for Rengua. For him and his men to pass through it eastward without being spotted, he had a trench dug in Lyamungo.

The Orio clan symbolized a wealthy, powerful group of people who were completely outside of Rengua's control, which is what drove him to execute such an unnatural deed. Because their sacred site Kimbushi was located there, he was worried that they might move in next door and take the land that was adjacent to him on the Weru Weru's near-side western bank. He might have been compelled by his relative weakness to such a harsh course of action because he could see no other path.

== The impact of the massacre at Lyamungo ==
The long-running conflict between the Machame and Kibosho peoples was sparked by his deed. There were two immediate repercussions. First of all, the practice of initiation rites following circumcision was discontinued in all the regions that recognized Rengua's leadership, i.e. in the entire Kikafu basin region and to Nguni and Kyuu, out of fear that the Kibosho might seek to avenge the slaughter at Kimbushi. Overall, it appears that initiation may have very recently arrived in the area, in which case its practice was transient because it was never picked up again.

Rengua's main goal in his attacks to the west was to steal livestock, but in his raids on Kibosho to the east, he killed men, women, and children. The justifications offered for this excessive brutality include his desire to terrify the populace and his warrior brother Mwara's simple desire to engage in combat. The Kibosho people were also subjected to "a very bad way" of torture by Rengua's soldiers, who would press hot banana peel against a man's body until he revealed where the women, children, and cattle were hiding.

Second, Rengua's operation was successful in that the Orio clan and their adherents abandoned their estates at Owaa in Lyamungo and retreated further east after losing their confidence as a result of their defeat on the eastern bank of the Weru Weru. As a result, there were no people in Lyamungo's bottom flat area, and it remained that way. The populace remained absent even after Kibosho's luck at the flood later turned for the better. Both Rebmann and von der Decken noted the emptiness of the "fine open champaign" when they passed through it in 1848 and 1861, respectively.

Rebmann would have discovered the land to be well settled had he arrived a few years earlier. It can only be explained in terms of its associations with the massacre at Kimbushi in the minds of the people of Kibosho that Lyamungo remained empty until the end of the 19th century, and that when it was then, significantly enough, it was resettled not by Kibosho clans but by clans from Machame and by European farmers. Even though the Kibosho did not return to Lyamungo to take control of it, they carried on offering sacrifices to the shrines at Owaa and Kimbushi till the present.

Rengua himself had a tendency of traveling across the nation to visit his buddy Mangi Ntesha of the Tarimo clan, who was then in charge of Mweka, the tiny nation immediately to the east of Kibosho, between Kibosho and Uru. Rengua used this friendship as a weapon against the Kibosho. Kashenge and his father Kirenga were living in exile in lower Uru, which at the time was an open country. They had spent well over six years there reconstructing themselves following the massacre at Kimbushi, Lyamungo. They were aware of Rengua's visits to Mweka and his custom of pausing to rest under a specific tree in the area that is now mtaa Nsinga, which is below Mweka.

On their way to buy some bananas in upper Uru one day, Kashenge and his men surprised Rengua under this tree. The tree is known as Mruka wa Rengua in Machame and Mruka wa Tobo in Kibosho (the mruka tree of the man Tobo whose land it stood). A large tree, maybe the same one, still exists there today on a little grass island where three paths converge. After a struggle broke out, Kashenge chased Rengua and his men back to Machame, which had also been caught off guard.

Kashenge fought and set fire to homes for three days in Machame. Then, he sent news to his father, requesting that he come back to Kibosho and send men to assist him in retrieving the livestock he had captured. According to Kibosho oral tales, Kashenge's successful raid may or may not have been the last between the two nations during the reign of Rengua.

The last raid, according to Machame oral traditions, was Rengua's victory over the Kibosho at the bloody battle of Lala, where his men slaughtered every living thing they came across, including men, women, and children. If this is the case, then Rengua's annoyance at Kashenge's success may well account for the excessively harsh tactics used by his men in that battle. In any event, Kashenge's exploit represents the Kibosho's first symbolic commitment of retribution against Rengua for killing their initiates, a pledge that would later in the century be fully honored.

== Legacy ==
It has often been said that Rengua ruled half of Kilimanjaro, from the far west to as far east as the Nanga River, and that he met the great ruler from the farther east, Orombo, on the banks of the Nanga. They then divided Kilimanjaro into their two separate spheres of influence, west, and east of the Nanga. As a sign of the esteem in which the Machame people hold their late chief Rengua, this well-known and frequently told tale deserves consideration.

Because it is believed that Mangi Rengua did not live to see his grandson, he must have passed away in his early middle years. He is regarded as the greatest Machame chief. The focal point of his reign was Foo, an area east of the Kikafu, from where he easily expanded his influence throughout the Kikafu basin region. The masumba acknowledge his leadership and his authority to demand payment in the form of livestock from them. His capture of Kibosho in the east was the key to his success. These are the two things that made him successful, and they are both important.

Additionally, it could be argued that at the height of his influence, Rengua was the dominant force in the region of western Kilimanjaro that stretched from the far west of the Shira plateau complex of countries eastward to Uru. However, this definition must be expanded to include local leaders who thrived without Rengua's knowledge and outside of his control but who were not on par with him in stature.

Because Mangi Rengua's successful expeditions were an anomaly in the Kikafu basin region, whose peoples neither before nor after him were particularly warlike or distinguished in battle, Mangi Rengua's reputation stands out in memory in Machame. And here, the type of spear that gave Rengua his technical superiority should be seen in its proper perspective: undoubtedly, it represented a development in the Kikafu basin region, but the length of its iron point shouldn't be overestimated, as there is every reason to believe that this was very small, no longer than one hand's span, and should not be confused with the long lethal spearhead that didn't appear until later on Kilimanjaro and then in Kibosho.

Rengua, the name he was given, means "the cutter-down," and he undoubtedly did chop down the Kibosho. It is also remembered that his people admired him because of the cattle that they were able to obtain as a result of his raids. He was quite generous with his meat distribution because he was kind to them. His reign was one of the most glorious in Machame's history.

== See also ==
- Mangi Ngalami
- Mangi Meli
- Chagga states
