= Cursing stone =

Cursing stone may refer to:

- Bullaun, an Irish or Scottish hollowed stone
- Cursing Stone and Reiver Pavement, a public artwork in Carlisle, Cumbria, England by Gordon Young
- Cursing stone, an object in the religious traditions of the historic sovereign Chagga state Sina, in present-day Tanzania
