= Hai language =

Hai may be:

- Central Banda language
- Mashami language (Chaga)
