= Machame =

Historic Chagga State of Kilimanjaro

Kingdom of Machame
- Kwamangi ya Mashame (Machame)
- Ufalme wa Machame
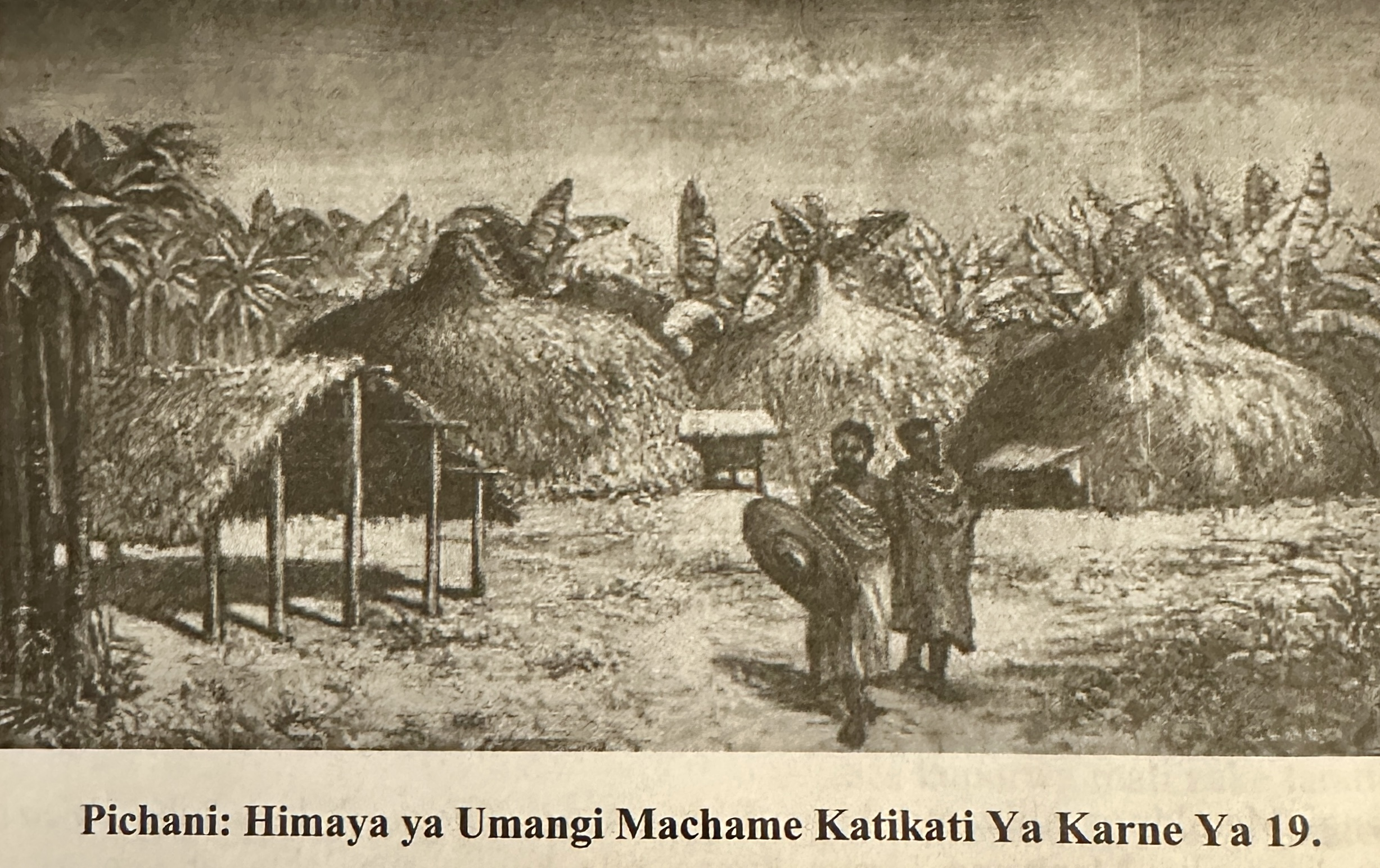
- Machame Kingdom 19th Century

- Location within Tanzania
- 3°12′00″S 37°13′59″E
- Type: Settlement
- Cultures: Chagga states
- Associated with: Mangi Rengua and Mangi Mamkinga of Machame
- Location: Machame Kaskazini, Moshi District, Kilimanjaro Region, Tanzania

History
- Built: c.17th century CE
- Abandoned: 1962

Site notes
- Material: Earth structure
- Condition: Endangered
- Owner: Ward Government
- Public access: Allowed

Machame and Masama Map

Machame or Kingdom of Machame (Kichagga: Kwamangi ya Mashame; Swahili: Ufalme wa Machame) was a historic sovereign Chagga state located in modern day Machame Kaskazini ward in Hai District of Kilimanjaro Region in Tanzania. Historically, the Machame kingdom was in 1889 referred by Hans Meyer as a great African giant, the kingdom was also the largest and most populous of all the Chagga sovereign states on Kilimanjaro, whose ruler as early as 1849 was reckoned as a giant African king with influence extending throughout all Chagga states except Rombo.

By the 1860s, a German explorer Von der Decken (popularly known to the Chagga as Baroni), presented Machame as a confederation of western Chagga states comprising Narumu, Kindi, Kombo, to as far as the Western end of Kibongoto (Siha), each with their own chiefs under the king of Machame. 'Baroni' observed that by that time only two of the Chagga states had some autonomy from the king of Machame, namely, Lambongo (later Kibosho under powerful chief Sina) and Kilema.

== Machame language ==
Although sometimes lumped with other Chaga languages, Machame is a distinct language (also known as "Kimachame" in Swahili and as "Kimashame" or "Kimashami" in the Machame language itself. For most inhabitants of Machame and Masama (i.e., the Machame "tribe"), including children born and raised in this area, Kimachame is their first language; Swahili and English are learned via formal schooling.

== Geography ==
Physically, the location identified today as Machame forms several of the wards of the Hai District, in Kilimanjaro Region, Tanzania.

== History ==
=== Origins ===
An early ancestor named Mashame was revered by the entering ancestors of the current dominant clans in the Kikafu region which includes Masama. The name Machame, which was already in use when the first European traveler Rebmann landed on the east bank of the Kikafu in 1848, was given to all the region that was encircled by this network of mountainous rivers in his honor. Mashame was remembered as the guy who ascended the Kikafu valley until he arrived at the central area of the new homeland, which was between the confluence of the Namwi and Kikafu rivers (or, perhaps more specifically, between the Namwi and Marire rivers near Sienyi). Mashame was followed by even more significant ancestors, whose journeys over the plain to the Kikafu were memorialized in sacred shrines. Other sources claim that the Machame people and Meru people are said to have migrated from the Usambara mountains in Tanga Region 400 years ago to Kilimanjaro Region.

Machame was the largest and most populated kingdom on Kilimanjaro, according to German Dr. Bruno Gutmann's recorded history of the area. Their stories make it abundantly obvious that the original settlers arrived from the southern plains and gradually ascended to their territory. Their faith, as is so often the case, preserved their past. The oldest ancestral temple is located on the Kikafu River's bank in a plain that extends past the motorway between Moshi and Arusha. The oldest community is simply referred to as "Nkukun," or "the old man's place."

Previously, the mangi traveled there to offer sacrifices to this long-dead first ancestor, accompanied by all of his soldiers dressed in battle gear. The "Shrine of the Secret Path" is located in the scrub of the vacant plain between this memorial and the area where they currently reside. The surrounding country is practically desolate, as this term suggests. Also left unnamed is the leader whose remains are interred there. On his trip to Nkukun, the mangi offered a sacrifice here as well. From the second shrine to the third shrine, an almost straight path exists. Because the ancestor who is interred there guided the people up to their current abundant country, this is where the named tradition starts.

His descendants have kept his name, Masami (Mashame). The straight line from this highly revered shrine bends towards Kibo's summit and points upward like a bent arrow to the mountain slopes and the chief's current house. In the Usaa (Uswa) district, the following shrine, the Grove Uroki, is located higher up the slope. This forest rose above Mashame's wife's grave, from whose remains a powerful, crystal-clear spring emerged that supplied a lush sacrifice pond with water. All Machame people venerate this elderly woman as their tribal ancestor. Close to the lowest farmhouse of the current chief, in the vicinity of the Kikafu valley, her son is interred beneath a linden tree.

Masami also inspired the name of the Machame people. They fought the native occupants possibly the Koningo for a very long time, gradually taking the country. They crept silently up the wooded valley, hiding behind stones until dawn, and then unleashed their attacks on the gullible villagers. They introduced the usage of short, broad-bladed iron spears to this region early. They had a definite advantage thanks to their weaponry. Driven to the western slopes, the first inhabitants settled in the area that is now Shira. They had a significant Maasai blood admixture even during that period. The latter being unlikely, as the Maasai arrived in the early 19th century from the north in Kenya.

Additionally, there were Wakamba communities nearby that engaged in pottery-making and hunting. The Machame were a loosely grouped clan from the beginning of their tenure on the mountain. Each clan gradually grew and occupied the area it does today. Every community reveres the original settler as the ancestor of its clan. As a result, the Machame chiefs' history barely dates back a few generations. The man who defeated the clan chiefs is still mentioned today. A wealthy king, his name was Kivarya.

After that, Gutmann goes into great detail on how Kivárya (Kiwaria) was ridiculed since he had only daughters. After having a boy named Rengua, he finally sent him "to the Varoo on Mount Meru to the west of Kilimanjaro, which was also colonized from Machame" while dressing him as a lady. He developed there into a robust young man and eventually went back home. With the name of Rengua, Gutmann takes us as far forward in time as the early 19th century, to the time when written records first appear and oral traditions begin to become richer; the period of Rengua is the furthest point in time to which elderly men's memories can currently be concretely traced.

The account of Gutmann serves as a helpful foundation for discussion. The five ancestor shrines that serve as a reminder of their journey into the nation come first. There is no question that these shrines exist. Even today, when the issue of origins is significantly more complicated than it was in Gutmann's time, oral traditions still support them. There is visual proof, as one of the first two shrines cited by Gutmann, maybe the first and oldest of all is the lone upright smooth white stone standing in the Nkya clan's land in the plain.

The sacred stone was moved from its known original location by the Machame chief sometime around 1945 to make room for a wider road. As of 1964, it stands close by among tilled ground. Long before there was a mangi in Machame, the legend states that there was a temple and the site of youth initiation. One branch of the Nkya clan gives the name Nkunda to a man, which may be a reference to the oldest shrine, which Gutmann refers to as "Nkukun" or "at the old man's" in his book. According to rumors, there are two further sites of worship nearby, which would match up with Gutmann's first three shrines.

The third shrine, dedicated to the ancestor Mashame, was located farther away from the confluence of the rivers Namwi and Marire and higher up on the mountainside than the other two. In other places, Gutmann claims that it was in the area Ngira, which is today a part of Mtaa Sonu, and that above it was the sacred grove Uroki, where the burial of Mashame's wife was. From her body, a spring emerged, feeding the sacrificial pond, which Gutmann refers to as the Sienyi pond.

In other parts of Kilimanjaro, such as Ngasseni, which is now a part of Usseri, the men are remembered as the early ancestors. Occasionally on the eastern side of the mountain, however, it is celebrated that the first ancestor arrived with his wife who was named but who is not accorded the respect that was bestowed upon the wife of Mashame.

The three sacred shrines of Mashame, his wife, and his son were still present during Gutmann's time and, according to Gutmann, the chiefs themselves visited them to offer sacrifices to the tribe's ancestors. These shrines are located close to Sienyi. Following current oral traditions, sacrifices were also made under the leadership of Mangi Ngulelo of Machame, who ruled from 1901 to 1917. Old men who felt their deaths were imminent would travel to Sienyi and pass away shortly after. For all the clans in the Kikafu basin, the evidence of Sienyi's holiness is overwhelming. This prompted Gutmann to receive his first baptism as a Christian in the area using water from the revered spring in the Uroki grove.

However, by 1960, the entire custom uniting the top clans in adoration of their shared ancestors Mashame and his wife had been subdued, if not completely abolished, and no man dared visit the location Sienyi. The transformation can be attributed to the influence of Christian missions, which sought to weaken the power of such a pagan ceremonial hub. There is no reason to believe that they would not leave the memories alone, nevertheless. Christian missionaries put an end to the ancient fire-worshiping community that had united the Shira plateau peoples to the west in Siha, but they did not attempt to ignore its historical significance.

The primary cause of the suppression of the Sienyi shrines of the ancestors must be looked for elsewhere. It can be discovered by examining the ongoing rivalry between the dominant clans over the past 100 years. The Kombe, Lema, Nkya, and Shoo clans are the biggest and most dominant. Since the reign of Rengua, who reigned in the second quarter of the 19th century, the Kombe clan has produced the region's kings.

Invading colonizers—first German, then British—who weighed the longevity of their ruling dynasty heavily when evaluating the significance of the various chiefs arrived with the establishment of the German administration in 1886. Since it offered them two ways to strengthen the institution of chieftainship and set the ruling royal clan above and apart from the rest, chiefs would likely have adopted the idea of lengthening one's dynasty as well as asserting, sometimes quite without foundation, that one's clan was the oldest and most originally settled; however, the process was undoubtedly sped up as a shrewd reaction to the standards of the European colonizers.

Due to this, the Machame mangis rejected the idea that all clans shared a common ancestor and ancestral home. This custom was established in the 1890s when Machame was still a small chiefdom and was steadfastly followed in the years that followed 1923 when Machame under wise leadership rapidly expanded to become the dominant force on Kilimanjaro. It was necessary to solve two issues. First, the custom of clans migrating together. Second, there was the custom that one of their clans, and not the Kombe clan, was given special status because of its greater ties to the great grandfather.

== Clans of Machame ==
Historically, two mitaa were already producing recognized leaders, namely Masama, where the Moro clan was already established as the leading one, and that part of Sonu known as Ngira, where the Nkya clan was already dominant. In Lemira and Sawe, it is likely that the clans Kimaro and Sawe were respectively established by this time, whereas in Roo the Swai clan seems to have been a later arrival. All of these clans sprang from ancestors who had once resided in the triangular region of territory formed by mitaa Sonu, Uswa, and Shari, the compact center of the Kikafu system.

The second region, which included the mitaa Uswa, Shari, and Keri, was a populous fertile enclave from which people who moved elsewhere had branched off. It was located between the east bank of the Marire River and the west bank of the Kikafu. It was unquestionably one of the most densely populated areas, especially in the lower sections of Uswa and Shari. What leaders it did have, however, have since been forgotten because this area was later the one most affected by feuds that had spread from the eastern bank of the Kikafu, serving as a base for different factions to seek refuge and exact revenge, and having the most erratic population due to migration into and out of it.

The centrally established core of the population was to remain more stable in the third region, which was east of the Kikafu and was centered on mitaa Nronga, Foo, Wari, and Nkuu. The focal point was Foo, which had been inhabited the longest. There, between the deep gorges of the rivers Semira and Mwanga, the Lema, Kombe, and Nkya clans had coexisted side by side from west to east on territories next to one another. The Nkya clan gradually migrated east to the Nkuu people, while the Lema clan moved west across the Semira to the Nronga people.

The Kombe clan, which had resided between them, continued to hold sway in Foo and expanded lower down the hillside to the nearby Wari during the reign of Rengua's successor. The core of these three great clans was to remain unchanged in the same mitaa up until the current day, despite leading individuals and in some cases, entire groups fleeing.

== Ruling clans of Machame ==
According to the oral traditions of the Nkya clan, it can be traced back to a man named Nkya, who was an agreed ancestor of the clan. In the plain, in a location known as Mululuni, Nkya is claimed to have made his home. He has several sons there. One of them was Mashame, who traveled and settled in Sienyi. From him descended the Kombe, Lema, Shoo, and other clans of Machame, as well as Mremi, who left for the Meru people.

The evidence for this is that Masai of the Mbatian-Lenana group swears by the name of Nkya in Kimasai, calling him "Kidonyoi," which translates to "the tail" or "the beginning," and that Leitai, another son of Nkya, traveled southward from Mululuni across the plains to the Masai. The chiefs of Uru are supposed to be descended from a third son of Nkya by the name of Mshanga who is said to have gone from Mululuni to a location in lower Uru, then to Njoro (the spring in present-day Moshi town), and finally up to the center of Uru.

Nkya dynasty of Machame
Mangi	Regin	Area	Notes
Nkya	Unknown	Mululuni	First settled at Mululuni in the plain
Mashame	Unknown	Sienyi	First settler at Sieyi, son of Nkya
Leitai	Unknown	Sienyi	Part Maasai, son of Nkya
Mshanga	Unknown	Sieyi	Ancestor of the Uru mangis, son of Nkya
Sangira	Unknown	Sienyi	Son of Mashame
Shoo	Unknown	Sienyi	Son of Mashame
Mkei	Unknown	Sienyi	Son of Sagira
Mremi	Unknown	Sienyi	Son of Mkei
Nambaa	Unknown	Sienyi	Son of Sagira
Kimule	Unknown	Sienyi	Son of Nambaa
Nchau	Unknown	Sienyi	Son of Kimule
Sisia	Unknown	Sienyi	Son of Nchaau
Kimaro	Unknown	Sienyi	Son of Shoo, settled in Foo
Sawe	Unknown	Foo	Son of Kimaro
Ntemi	Unknown	Foo	Son of Kimaro
Kiwaria	Unknown	Foo	Son of Kimaro
Kombe	Unknown	Foo	Son of Kimaro
Rengua	Unknown	Foo	Son of Kimaro

This version provided by the Nkya clan by its current oral traditions must be compared to the contradicting present-day versions provided by other important clans. The earliest ancestors in each situation can be traced back to Rengua's reign. The fact that the Kombe clan has a recorded genealogy, the first of its sort, which was put together by Europeans in the 1890s, further complicates the process of clarification. The active leader of the Machame Lutheran mission, the Rev. Müller, created the list.

Lema dynasty of Machame
Mangi	Regin	Area	Notes
Mashame	Unknown	Sienyi	First settler at Sieyi, son of Nkya
Nrwa	Unknown	Sienyi	Moved to Meru
Lema	Unknown	Sieyi	son of Mashame
Nkya	Unknown	Sienyi	Son of Mashame
Siwa	Unknown	Sienyi	Son of Lema
Masenya	Unknown	Sienyi	Son of Siwa
Suma	Unknown	Sienyi	Son of Siwa
Mboya	Unknown	Sienyi	Son of Siwa
Matawana	Unknown	Sienyi	Son of Siwa, remembered as a great warrior
Kiwaria	Unknown	Sienyi	Son of Siwa, remembered as a great warrior
Masake	Unknown	Sienyi	Son of Matawana, remembered as a great warrior

Kombe dynasty of Machame according to the mangi's descendants in the 1960s
Mangi	Regin	Area	Notes
Ntemi	Unknown	Sienyi	Kombe's ancestor
Kiwaria	Unknown	Sienyi	Son of Ntemi
Kombe	Unknown	Sieyi	son of Kiwaria
Rengua	Unknown	Sienyi	Son of Kombe

Kombe dynasty of Machame from records in the 1890s
Mangi	Regin	Area	Notes
Uroki	Unknown	Sienyi	Kombe's ancestor
Nkya	Unknown	Sienyi	Son of Uroki
Sawe	Unknown	Sieyi	son of Uroki
Tolondo	Unknown	Sienyi	Son of Sawe
Tuware	Unknown	Sienyi	Son of Tolondo
Kimaro	Unknown	Sienyi	Son of tuware
Ntemi	Unknown	Sienyi	Son of Kimaro
Kombe I	Unknown	Sienyi	Son of Ntemi
Kiwaria	Unknown	Sienyi	Son of Kombe I
Kombe II	Unknown	Sienyi	Son of Kiwaria
Rengua	Unknown	Sienyi	Son of Kiwaria

Müller received land from the Kombe clan's then-chief, Mangi Shangali, on which to establish and further his mission as the major hub of Lutheran activity in and around Kilimanjaro. In exchange, Müller served as Shangali's biggest supporter and benefactor. Müller indirectly compiled the chief's line's family tree. From among his Chagga converts, he chose agents. They sought the advice of some elderly men, who provided them with stories in exchange for gifts of fabric. The agents' names as well as those of the people they consulted are known.

The fact that Müller got his information from a third party creates the potential for inaccuracy. They get stronger once it is understood that the elders the agents questioned did not represent any perspective other than that of a certain Kombe clan subset. The fact that Nathaniel Mtui, a Chagga historian, assumed control of this list after visiting Machame to gather information for Major Dundas.

The four accounts—three oral and one written—offer an intriguing topic for investigation, however, there have been so many false leads that some facts have undoubtedly been lost for good. But certain things are crystal clear. In the first place, Mashame was an early common ancestor of the clans as described by Gutmann. The fact that the recorded account names Uroki as the first ancestor of the Kombe clan unquestionably supports this claim, as Uroki is not the name of a person but rather a location—the holy grove of Mashame's wife in Sienyi.

Second, due to its connection to the great first ancestor, the Nkya clan was especially revered. A piece of outside evidence supports this: when the Kombe, Lema, and Nkya clans eventually moved higher up the mountainside to settle in Foo between the rivers Semira and Mwanga, the youths of all three clans traveled to the Nkya clan's meeting place Kyalia to be circumcised. Additionally, the Nkya clan produced the medicine men who blessed the nation and sprinkled the cattle and the goats with water mixed with herbs during times of famine or disease.

Thirdly, it is questionable whether one can be more precise about the various ancestors listed by various clans as having lived between the time of Mashame and the time of Rengua than to say that these, whatever their respective clans (for of this there is doubt), were leading figures whose names have endured in memory. Rengua is essentially the start of popular Machame history.

The reign of Rengua can be dated to the first part of the 19th century, and more specifically, his ascent and reign are most likely to have taken place between 1820 and 1842. Since Mamkinga's Swahili magician, Nesiri, to whom he owed power, told Rebmann that he had been living there for six years, and because Rebmann's accompanying Swahili guide, Bwana Kheri, had personally seen a frost-bitten survivor of Rengua's silver expedition, we can infer from the record that Mamkinga had already established himself as the ruler when he visited Machame in 1848.

We know from oral traditions that once Rengua abdicated, there was a time of confusion and conflict before Mamkinga took control. All of this aids in pinpointing the day Rensua gave up. The oral tradition that Rengua passed away before he met his grandchild, that is, in his early middle age, is the only way to go backward from that date to the time when he had assumed authority. The seizure of power by Rengua signaled significant changes in the region that continued wave after wave throughout the remainder of the 19th century. Before going into detail about these, it might be worthwhile to consider the way of life that the Kikafu Basin community displayed before he rose to power.

By that time, people were living in little clan groups on the fertile area between the ravines of the great Kikafu and its tributaries, spreading forth and higher on the mountainside. Some of Kilimanjaro's deepest ravines served as protective insulating walls that allowed for independence. As a result, tiny self-sufficient villages sprouted up and made their way along each mtaa, which was itself bounded by river boundaries. The richest and most influential men (isumba or masumba in Kichagga) served as the leaders in each.

According to legend, people back then avoided killing one another and harbored a profound aversion to the spilling of human blood. Instead, they engaged in combat with sharpened sticks that could deliver a good slashing wound; iron weapons were nonexistent. One of the things that unite the peoples of the Kikafu basin is this tradition, which is kept with an odd intensity in contrast to the mild remnants of the same theme that can be found elsewhere on Kilimanjaro.

=== Etymology ===
At this stage we will look at three important words in the Chagga history, chagga, kilimanjaro and moshi. Historian Mary K. Stahl and explorer Charles New give their opinions as to the meanings of the first two words. The origin of the word Chagga (dschagga or jagga) is not very clear today. K. Stahl gives differing opinions as to its origin although one of her opinions seem to concur with Charles new's meaning of "getting lost" or "to give farewell to someone who is about to take a journey that you are not sure if they will be back (as they may get lost forever)". In earlier Swahili language this would have been called 'kuchaaga' meaning to say bye. Today's Swahili is 'kuaga'. Why the land was attached with the word 'to get lost'? This is where the stories begin. It is claimed that the first coastal trade people to get into the land got lost due to the thick forests. As hypothesized by Stahl, it took them days to get their original route again and they thought that their getting lost was mysterious. When they went back to the coast they spread this news and the land was called Chaga (or Chagga) as a sign of getting lost.

Another explanation of the origin of the word, which also missionary Charles New mentioned as he quoted rev. Johannine Rebmann, is that the word came out of a terrible event that befell on people. The years of the event are not known to us but it was a time when a powerful chief of Machame, Rengua, was ruling and at that time caravans from the coast had already started to get there to trade on ivory with the natives. Being constantly instigated by the Swahili people that what is on top of the mountain has to do with silver which promises much richness to his kingdom, Chief Rengua sent a large band of emissary to get as much silver as possible down to him. A caravan trader from the coast Bwana Heri who accompanied rev. Rebmann to the mountain told him that he actually saw one of the survivors of the tragedy who had become disabled due to freezing temperature as they went up the mountain. The rest of the envoy perished on the way. The story that survived was that on the mountain there is a spirit that will destroy anyone who would try to get close to it, and the Swahili who were at the court of Rengua, seeing the disaster that had befallen those who went up, spread news to the coast that anyone trying to get higher on the mountain will get lost as the mountain has the dreadful spirit.

The land was called chagga as commemoration of the tragedy. This story apart from being backed up by the people who were close to the event as recorded in the history books, also connects very well with stories that circulated in the coast when rev. Rebmann arrived there on his mission to the Chagga. On learning that Rebmann wanted to go to the land of Chagga, the Swahili sultan of Mombasa who was an Arab, warned him that the land is dangerous as there is a spirit on the mountain that destroys people and he might get lost when he tries to do so. He mentioned to Rebmann that the name of the spirit (as known in the coast) was 'ndscharo' and hence the mountain was called mountain of ndscharo (i.e. kilimandscharo). He could nearly stop Rebmann from going to the land of Chagga if it were not for Rebmann's persistence to go there. However, it shows that earlier the people of Chagga were known as 'wakirima', i.e. people of the mountain (kirima was an old Swahili word for a hill). Where they lived was known as the land of Chagga (i.e. land of getting lost) although later on the name was attached to the people themselves.

Of importance however, is the way the name 'Moshi' became prominent among the people of the mountain and by the early 1900s it could almost be used synonymously with the name of the Chagga land. Moshi was one of the chiefdoms in Chagga ruled by Rindi (1860–1890). Before that time the name scarcely surfaced in history although it seemed to be a recognisable location of some prominence. For example, in 1849, Rev. Rebmann mentions a young man who had come all the way from Moshi to trade honey and milk with his men when they camped at Machame. He also records in his diary of trouble in Kirua caused by one Kirumi who was supported by allies from Moshi (where his mother came from) to overthrow his father Marengo. This happened when Rev. Rebmann and his men were still in Kilema. These instances are the first appearances of Moshi in historical records, and just after a decade, Von der Decken records Moshi as a recognisable chiefdom although still not attained some autonomy from Machame as he observed earlier.

During Decken's visit to Chagga a young chief Rindi was ruling in Moshi. With much witticism and intrigue, and under the regency of his mother Mamchaki, Rindi established his chiefdom from a place known as tsudunyi in early 1860 and using the location of his chiefdom as a strategic advantage, directed many caravan traders to the mountain into his land. With much ambitions to power he even sabotaged caravans which did not show intention to pass through his chiefdom and those explorers who asked for guidance to other chiefdoms he conspired with his men who misguided them and got them lost or back to his chiefdom. However, there are indications that during his early days in power he acquired support from Machame to cleverly establish his presence in the east. By the early 1870s he could declare to foreigners that the whole of Chagga was divided into two major powers; Machame under Ndesserua being the greatest in the West and himself an important chief in the east. He substantiated his claim by providing a letter to Charles New that granted him safe passage to every chiefdom he could visit to the east of Chagga.

Having acquired autonomy from Machame through allied raids to the east of Chagga and as far as Usambara, with extraordinary diplomatic schemes, by 1870 he could direct to his capital, Moshi, most missionaries and explorers who started to flock into the Chagga. This seemingly well calculated generosity made his chiefdom extremely popular to the coast and to the Europeans. Apart from all these well learned visitors to his chiefdom, it was an explorer Sir Henry H.H. Johnston in 1884 who attempted to work on the etymology of the land. He investigated the meaning of the word 'Moshi' and the answers he got from traditional elders and others was just the variant of its pronunciations, like 'mushi', or 'muschi', 'moschi' etc.etc. One thing he was assured was that the name did not relate to the Swahili word for smoke, i.e. moshi, as Chagga had a different word for that. He therefore had to conclude that the word 'probably comes from one of the kichagga terms or word'. It's amazing how at that time couldn't the people of Moshi know the origin of the word for their chiefdom? It is not clear when they told him it was 'mushi' if they meant name of people, a certain locality or another pronunciation. However, a story that circulates now among the natives of the land (which is also repeated by Professor Isaria Kimambo and A.J. Temu in their book) is that the name Moshi is a modification of the name of a certain locality near that of Chief Rindi's boma (court), and that place was very popular at that time. The place was known as Kimotchi which was a popular local market in the area. But the problem with this theory is how would a chief's neighbouring village become the name of his chiefdom and the transition from Kimotchi to Motchi (or Moshi) is not very clear. Whatever the case is, the fact is that the meaning for the word 'Moshi' as used for Rindi's chiefdom is not clear to us today.

== Machame as a political establishment ==
Original Name	M(a)shami
Preceded by	Kikafu Basin Settlement
Founded	Late 17th Century
The Ruling House	Mushi
Royal Family	Mushi/Kombe/Shangali Dynasty
Traditional Salutation	Kafo Kombe Mushi! Kafo Kimaro Shangali!
Royal Family Surname	Mushi

Mary Kathleen Stahl correctly presents the middle southwestern settlement of the Chagga as the Kikafu basin settlement. Her history, although written from a revisionist point of view, aligns to some extent with native narrations and some earlier written sources on the area. Before Kikafu basin settlement there was no Machame as the latter was a later development based on what happened around the Kikafu basin. The ancestors who migrated to the Chagga at that time settled along the Kikafu river basin in an area today close to where the main road from Moshi to Arusha passes. Narrations identify two leaders of the populace; Mshami and Lemireny (popularly known as Nrwo). Lemireny means 'path finder'; the one believed to be endowed with insights to discern the right direction, and Mshami, whose leadership was by virtue of being the eldest son of Lemireny's elderly brother Nyari who had died while en route from their earlier settlement. It is not clear for how long they settled along the lower plain of Kikafu river near today's village of Kwa Sadala, but what is recalled is that after sometime they resolved to part with Lemireny (either also known as Mbise or was his son) choosing to go to settle on the plains of Mount Meru. However, some narrations claim that Mbise the lesser, chose the junior Meru as Mshami the elder settled with the senior, i.e. Kilimanjaro. |- Kafo Mushi! Kafo Shangali!

== See also ==
- Chagga states
- Siha (Kibongoto)
- Rengua
- Ngalami
- Chaga languages
