= Siha (Kibongoto) =

Historic Chagga State of Kilimanjaro

Kingdom of Siha
- Kwamangi ya Siha (Machame)
- Ufalme wa Siha
- Siha Map

- Location within Tanzania
- 3°11′22.2″S 37°4′47.64″E
- Type: Settlement
- Cultures: Chagga states
- Associated with: Mangi Ngalami of Siha
- Location: Nasai, Siha District, Kilimanjaro Region, Tanzania

History
- Built: c.17th century CE
- Abandoned: 1962

Site notes
- Material: Earth structure
- Architectural style: Chagga
- Condition: Endangered
- Owner: Ward Government
- Public access: Allowed

Siha or Kingdom of Siha (Machame: Kwamangi wa Siha; Swahili: Ufalme wa Siha), also sometimes referred to as Kibongoto, was a historic sovereign Chagga state located in modern-day Machame Kaskazini ward in Hai District of Kilimanjaro Region in Tanzania. Siha was located west of the Ushira plateau on Mount Kilimanjaro. The word Mangi means king in Kichagga. The kingdom is known for Mangi Ngalami that was hanged together with 18 other Leaders of the Chagga states including Mangi Meli, by the German colonial regime in 1900.

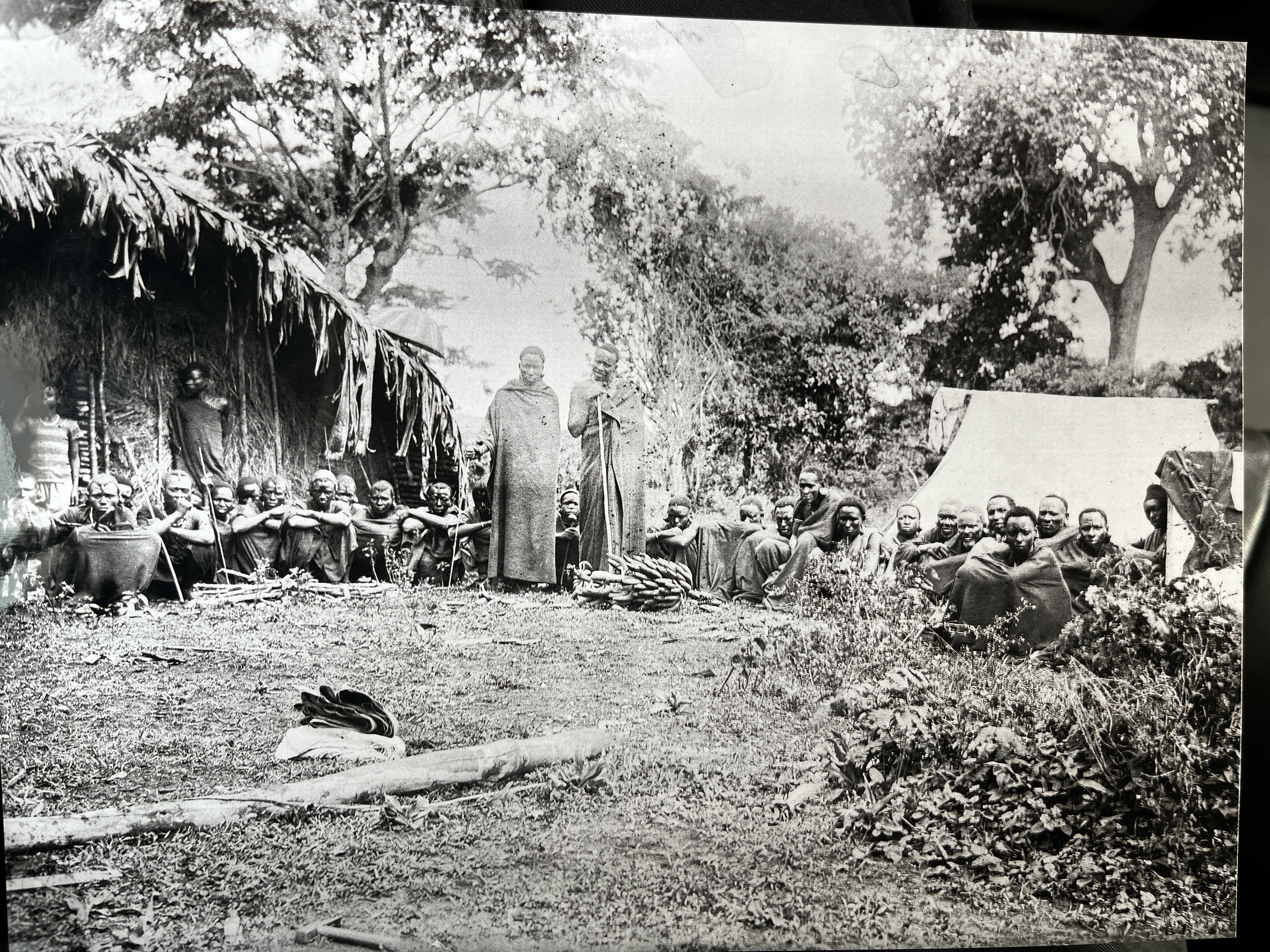
Mangi Ngalami, King of the Siha c.1880s–1900

== Overview ==
The most westerly dispersion center on Kilimanjaro is the high Shira plateau, a vast protrusion of towering tableland created on the hillside by ancient volcanic eruptions. For approaching travelers, the plateau served as a natural resting point. They arrived from further around the mountain in a westerly direction, moving across the high savanna above the forest line.

It's also possible that some people relocated there from previously inhabited areas on the now-empty north side of Kilimanjaro to avoid the fertile grassland there, which had the drawback of being vulnerable to assault from hostile communities. Some entered the Siha area and migrated steadily eastward while sticking to the high savanna until, at various naturally opportune falling places, they found their way downhill through the forest belt to establish themselves permanently in various mountainous areas in Siha.

Others moved down and spread out below the forest line, settling permanently in the area of the plateau itself. From west to east, these were old Samake, Mane, Kichicha, Sumu, Nguni, and Kyuu; below these, further down the hillside, these were Mrau, Komboko, Old Wanri, and Mae. They all lived in small individual semiautonomous Petty kingdoms called mitaa.

Together, this made up what might be referred to as the Shira plateau region, where the inhabitants shared a common history as well as unique traditions and languages. The Shira plateau peoples used the Sanya River, which is the most westerly river in the Chagga states, as their source of fresh water. Beyond it, however, there were only brackish streams until one reached the river Ngare Nairobi. The region came to an end in a wall of forest that stretched down the mountainside straight into the plain on the west; it was a natural terminal determined by fresh water.

The next large cluster of peoples, centered on the massive Kikafu River system, was closest to Nguni and Kyuu, petty kingdoms to the east. Oldony Muruak, a hill that the Maasai revere, and Mkeku, a hill that the Shira plateau and the people of Meru regard as the boundary between them, were located on the plain below.

The higher zone along the edge of the forest, particularly the old Samake, Mane, Nguni, and Kyuu (Kichicha and Sumu were sparsely populated), was the area that had been inhabited the longest. Everyone in these higher zones was the same. They remained in the upper region where they could, if necessary, quietly conceal their cattle from marauders in the forest and they shared the same language and customs. The remote Ngasseni and Usseri kingdoms who lived in the extreme east were these people's second connection to Kilimanjaro. They were connected by a high trail that encircled the mountain's back. These tiny pockets of settlement in the upper zone, which were situated high up, far apart, conservative, and most closely inhabited, may have given the entire area its name.

== Etymology ==
Although the area was at some point called Kibongoto. The previous name, Siha, is still consistently used by the locals today. It was also known by this name, and it was pronounced "Sita" by the Usseri people. Given that it was located on the outskirts of Kilimanjaro, high in a forest corner, the name "Sita" may be related to the Maasai word "La Sita," which means "something hidden in a corner" or "a hidden country." Siha can be used instead of the word "the Shira plateau region" because it is the name that the community there always uses.

The word "Shira" or the "Sira" used in the 19th century may have descended from Siha. The Nguni and Kyuu peoples of the area, as well as other peoples, are collectively referred to as "Siha" today. Additionally, it refers to the kingdom of Siha, which excludes the Nguni and Kyuu, a more recent unified entity by the late 1950s. The kingdom also goes by the name Kibongoto, which the first European immigrants who arrived there mispronounced as Komboko mtaa. On modern maps and in administrative records, Kibongoto is the name that is currently used, yet on the mountain, Siha is always used instead. The district of Siha is named after the former kingdom.

== Siha's leading clans ==
Early ancestors descended and settled in a specific mtaa, and their descendants have lived peacefully side by side there ever since. Clans were powerful and still are. The Orio, Kileo, and Masaki clans are still active in old Samake, along with the Nkini and Mmari clans in Mane, the Nathai clan in Nguni, the Munoo clan in Kyuu, and the Mwandri clan in old Wanri. There are only a few Mmari clan members who dwell in Maene, Komboko, Mrau, old Wanri, and Mae.

The Mmari clan had 500 male taxpayers in 1960. Their largest concentration was in the mtaa Mrau, right below Samake, where they made up roughly 150 of the mtaa's 600 male taxpayers, making them the most populous clan. In contrast, the Nkini and Kileo clans had 50 and 60 male taxpayers, respectively, and the Nathai clan had about 100 male taxpayers.

However, these numbers pale in comparison to the magnitude of the dominant clans in the eastern Kikafu basin complex. It would be interesting to find out if the larger size of the latter clans is related to the fact that they entered the country in a group, rather than singly, and shared a common great ancestor, which may have resulted in a tendency to form a few large clans rather than numerous small ones produced by separate arrivals of single ancestors.

All Siha clans believe they descended from the Shira plateau. They cite the fact that their worshiping locations are high on the plateau and that there are still remnants of this previous settlement there, such as furrows, ditches, and plantings of the Chagga sacred plant masale (dracaena fragrans). In the past, they lived all around the plateau, with Usseri residents using the other side. They kept livestock and lived on the high savannas when there were more open places available. Since then, the forest has grown both upward and downward.

Between the families, there was no parent clan or other ancestor connection. However, it is generally acknowledged that the Nkini clan was the first to leave the plateau and settle in Siha. Seven generations back to the first ancestor Nkini are remembered in this, the most illustrious and revered clan. He descended from a location on the plateau known as Wawa, an open area with red dirt that served as the only source of ochre in the region. It was encircled by dense plants and numerous bamboo.

All the Siha people sought for Nkini's descendants to make sacrifices at Wawa on their behalf and return with the holy flame because he brought with him the gift of creating sacred fires, which was to be passed down to his descendants. Nkini had a large herd of cattle and was a successful farmer who grew beans and eleusine. He was the first person to arrive in Mtaa Mane, and his clan stayed to maintain the fire rite and practice cultivation.

Seven generations go back to the arrival of the first ancestor Orio of the Orio clan. He descended and came to a stop just beyond the present-day forest border, at the location called Siki in ancient Samake. He left one son there. Wherever they went, Orio's sons ruled over others, being accepted as such by the locals not because of their fighting prowess but rather because of their wealth, which is to say, their cattle. After Orio himself moved on to Kibosho, his sons spread widely on Kilimanjaro. As a result, the Orio clan rose to prominence in Kibosho, Mbokomu, Keni, and Mwika in addition to old Samake.

According to legend, Orio was a tall man who arrived in Siki with a large herd of cattle as well as bows and arrows. He is thought to have been Maasai. His ancestors in Siha continue to perform sacrifice ceremonies as part of their ongoing commemoration of Orio's arrival. They travel to Siki with bows and arrows, where they erect a miniature temple surrounded by a thorn fence reminiscent of a Maasai boma. A tree that is also planted in the Maasai kraals is placed close to the home. To reflect the livestock of Orio, they placed a lot of wild berries inside the house. The youngsters are taught to pick up the berries in a particular way in the morning as though they were pulling cattle, and in the evening they are compelled to put the berries back as though they were pulling cattle. As a result, it is assumed that Orio was a Maasai.

Similar to the Munoo tribe, the Nathai clan lived in the east and was physically isolated from the other Shira plateau inhabitants by a ring of dense forest. According to remembered generations, the Nathai clan made its home before the Nkini clan, which is considered to be the oldest. If this was the case, an explanation would need to be found for the Nathai clan's dedication to the Nkini clan as keepers of the sacred fire, which served as the foundation for the high regard the clan received throughout the entire region.

The Nathai clan in Nguni is older than the Orio clan and has a notable heritage. It can be traced back nine generations to the arrival of the first ancestor Ondumai. He is also claimed to have arrived from the Maasai across the mountain's upper ridge. He was from a place called Kirarakwa, which is located west of the Sanya River up close to the border of the forest. He made his home in the elevated grasslands above Nguni. His descendant Mariko moved into Nguni proper five generations later. The tribe came down to Nguni to graze their cattle as Masai because they had discovered good open terrain there.

The Munuo clan has always been the dominant clan in the nearby mtaa, Kyuu, just as the Nathai clan has always been the dominant clan in Nguni. The first ancestor Kisangasa is regarded as the first of seven generations. He is said to have originated from Kibo (the highest point of Kilimanjaro), and he originally made his home at Matikoni, a location east of the Nathai clan in Nguni, which is situated between the rivulets Kishenge and Kawa. One of his sons settled in Kyuu after moving further down the mountainside.

The Masaki clan dates back to the first ancestor Makyora, who came down four generations ago and was a honey-hunter and cultivator of eleusine, beans, and bananas but with little wealth in cattle. The Mmari clan dates back to the first ancestor Lakanna, who came down from the plateau six generations ago and was a warrior, a great cattle-keeper, and a honey-hunter.

Every leading clan in Siha had a unique task to complete. The Masaki were the first to plant the seeds in the long rains and the Munoo in the short rains, as signs to the rest that it was time to sow. The Nkini clan was responsible for creating the sacred fire. The Mmari was tasked with conducting the raids. Blacksmiths in Siha were clanless and separated from one another. They were the "Wasuru" or "blacksmith's" clan, and it was forbidden for them to have any connections to other people. They would never mix with other clans. They even had a unique track of their own to go up and down where they lived in mtaa Mae.

Since the beginning of time, the Siha population, which is located at the westernmost point of Kilimanjaro, has maintained friendships with the Ngasseni and Usseri populations, which is located at the farthest eastern point. They spoke with one another over a high trail that encircled the mountain's back. The path began at Mtaa Maene and ascended via a gorge between the gorges of the rivers Fuga and Kasisa. It ascended through all the gullies, up through the forest, and then above it, up through the high savanna's grassland. After that, it wound downward to complete the mountain's circuit and reach Ngasseni.

The trail took this route up from Mane because, to the east of it, there were vast ravines, and to the west of it, at Ol Molog, there were Masai, a shared foe and many lions and leopards. The track passed the caves Nsairo and Ngaluma high above Mane, above the high savannas. It is said that when exploring the mountain in 1894, Capt. Johannes, the most well-known German officer who served in Moshi in the 1890s, is said to have hidden a box in this cave.

The first males from these two locations to dwell there in the distant past and establish communication with one another were Nsairo, a man from Maene, and Ngaluma, a man from Ngasseni or Usseri. The Siha people traded with the Ngasseni and Usseri at a market named "Kasingireni," a "small trading place," offering dry bananas and beans in exchange for weapons like knives, spears, swords, and lead armlets. Since there is no trace of the market in existence today, this tale was passed down from the ancestors.

The Siha, Ngasseni, and Usseri people used the route to move their livestock around so that the others could hide them during raids in their nations. Different Siha folk groups were periodically raided during the 19th century by Warush, the great raiders, as well as on occasion by Masai, the Machame during the reign of Mangi Ndesserua, and the Kibosho during the reign of Mangi Sina. Because of this the Siha, Ngasseni, and Usseri pursued becoming cow ranchers to a greater extent than any other group on Kilimanjaro, grazing their animals on wide fields instead of the typical stall-fed Chagga tradition. They lived on the mountain's outer wings. They had little trouble communicating because Kisha and Kisser languages were and are remarkably similar. Even more amazing, some Siha people were able to grasp Kingassa, the unique Chagga dialect spoken by the Ngasseni people, and the strangest linguistic oddity on the mountain.

== Religion and customs ==
Oddly, Siha used to be associated with the area of Kilimanjaro that was farthest away from it. Siha was unique on Kilimanjaro in terms of custom, particularly in its customs of stone-cursing and fire-worshipping. Every time a strange occurrence, such as an unlucky omen, a famine, or an epidemic, occurred in the nation, the sacred fire was lit. The Nkini clan was expected to offer prayers for all the Siha residents at these times.

During such calamities, the leading clan elders were requested to make a sacrifice on behalf of the gathered people. The elders would then proceed to Wawa, where they would sacrifice a sheep and light the sacred fire by rubbing two sticks together. The populace walked outside to greet them as they returned with a torch that was blazing. The Nkini elders used this torch to start a fire at an unidentified location in Mane named Kihubihu. A large tree and some bushes make up the shrine at Kihubihu, a high open meadow with a stunning view of Meru and Maasailand over the plains.

The fire that never went out at Kihubihu was made available to each mtaa for a specific day so they could come and collect new fire. Then, as a symbol of ridding the nation of disaster, all the ancient fires burning in the homes were extinguished, and the ashes were scattered. Two or three guys took a torch from Kihubihu and brought it to each mtaa where they lit an open fire. The populace used this to start fresh fires in their residences. Following this, the elders of the Nkini clan killed a spotless ram and combined its excrement and blood with a variety of plants and water in a container. Then, with a calabash in hand, each mtaa despatched a man, a boy, and a girl to gather some of the mixes.

They went around to each house, dipped some leaves in the calabash, and splashed the concoction inside the house without the residents' awareness when they returned to their mtaa soon before dusk so that they could not be seen. For three days, they repeated this ceremony in the early morning hours. The elders in each mtaa declared before the ceremony that it would begin on a specific day and that any outsiders should leave right away because they would not be permitted to do so during the ceremony. If a stranger was being pursued, he was required to stay until it was over. During this time, no one was permitted to take anything from their homes.

The inhabitants of Nguni and Kyuu took part in this tradition by sending their envoy to Kihubihu to get a torch lit. The flame was then used to start a large fire on a spectacular spot in Nguni, a high dramatic promontory encircled by steep ravines on three sides. This custom of devotion and purification by fire is unknown to have been practiced by anyone else on Mount Kilimanjaro. The new Lutheran mission ended the practice, and it may be a sign of its influence on people's thoughts that the mission decided to establish its first post in Siha, the kingdom's first Christian outpost, in the far-flung center of fire-worship, mtaa Mane. Before the First World War, the last time the tradition was used, a German administrative officer serving in Moshi predicted to the Siha people that they would see a shooting star in March 1910. When this happened, the Siha people asked the Nkini clan to lead the sacrifice at Wawa because they believed that it would be followed by disease.

The tradition of cursing stones in Siha was unique to that region of Kilimanjaro, unlike fire worship. Every small mtaa had a "Kite" curse stone. A two-fist-sized round chunk of lava rock with a hole in the middle, it was a unique form of stone. The clans in a mtaa would come together and select one clan to guard the stone and preserve it in a secret location. Even among members of the guardian clan, few were aware of its whereabouts. Its goal was to identify guilt in crimes like murder and theft.

The elders publicized their intention to organize a cursing ceremony two or three weeks in advance and stated that anyone who believed he had acted improperly had the opportunity to repent before the ritual. The stone was taken by the elders to a hidden location near the specified time when they scratched its interior surface to extract a small amount of powder. Then a she-goat that hadn't given birth was murdered. They combined its blood, the feces from its internal organs, the powder, a few herbs, and water from a unique spring known as Kiboi. This concoction was brought to the gathering spot where the ceremony was to take place in a calabash. Even though the mitaa have been combined, each ancient, now submerged mtaa continues to operate its own kite and maintains its independence from the stone.

After the heads of three chickens wrapped with inscriptions were discovered buried in the earth at three different locations in 1958, the Kite was employed in old mtaa Mae (now a part of mtaa Wanri), which was thought to be a Swahili form of enchantment. Although no one came forward to admit guilt during the ceremony, stolen pangas and beehives were eventually returned.

Two of the earliest populated locations, Maene and old Samake, came to dominate the constitutional history of Siha and its development into a single chieftainship. On the other hand, Nguni and Kyuu were dragged into the orbit of the Kikafu basin people to their east since they had an equal claim to old villages. This difference has a strong geographic component. In the far northwest corner, Mane and Samake were positioned.

Nguni and Kyuu resembled tiny Siha plateau neighbors in the east. They were protected by both marshes below them on the lower slopes and a thick belt of woodland on their west that served as a barrier between them and the rest of Siha. But to the east, they were exposed to the inhabitants of the nearby Kikafu Basin, who gradually influenced how their affairs were conducted.

Both the Nathai, the ruling clan in Nguni, and the Munoo, the ruling clan in Kyuu, produced little chiefs during the 19th century; however, when Siha became a unified chiefdom in 1900, they were excluded from it and were instead grouped with the Kikafu basin peoples as part of the chiefdom of Machame. These little chiefs had the same status as those who emerged from ruling clans to their west, elsewhere in the Shira plateau region. Aside from Nguni and Kyuu, the Orio, Kileo, Mmari, and Mwandri clans were the dominant ones among which authority in Siha alternated. The strands of all of these go back to the heights of old Samake and Maine, except the Mwandri clan, who reside on the middle slopes.

Their past reveals a concentration in fierce intra-clan rivalries to an extent uncommon in Kilimanjaro. This is because, in large part as a result of influences outside the chiefdom, the traditional rivalries of the 19th century continued into the 20th century. No clan has managed to secure a succession of several rulers in the current century, which means none has solidified its position to the point where it can impose an established perspective of history that is exaggerated in time upon the others. The result is that the past is foreshortened rather than lengthened, with memories scattered among the interests of numerous rivalries that are going on at once rather than being concentrated on one main source—the shifting fortunes of one ruling dynasty.

Siha has the benefit of involving sufficiently diverse interests to produce a balanced picture. The clan elder, also known as "Mkeku wa Kyungu," or "elder of the group," was once the most revered person. Then, over a short period in the second half of the 19th century, three monarchs rose to power, each of whom owed their success to the habits they had developed while residing with Masai or Warush at Arusha Juu (modern-day Arusha). Because one of them, Mmdusio, obtained his status through a friendship with a Masai man named Mbatian who is known to have lived during that time, the period may be pinpointed.

== Siha dynasties ==
Mmdusio of the Kileo clan in old Samake moved in with Mbatian, Laibon of the Masai, who was then residing in Ol Molog, at a location that is now known. From this point on, Siha's rulership is divided into three parts. Ochre was typically purchased from Wawa, which is located above Mt. Mane, by both Maasai and Samake people. Mmdusio moved into an open residence at Kifufu after returning to Siha. A mangi of the Nguni people (now a part of Masama kingdom), who had escaped westward with some of his people following a raid on his nation by Machame kingdom and had resided at Kifufu until he passed away.

As soon as Mmdusio returned to Samake, all three of the clans there—his own Kileo clan, the Orio clan, and the Masake clan—selected him to be their leader because it was known that he had lived with the Laibon, the Maasai people's traditional healer. There was no Maasai raid on Samake during his reign because he continued to keep cordial ties with the Laibon Mbatian by offering him gifts of honey. The two Maasai Laibons whose names are frequently mentioned in the Chagga's oral traditions are Mbatian and Lenana.

A competing Orio clan member killed Mmdusio in Samake, and it was this clan that gave birth to the subsequent powerful leader, Kirema. He shared a residence in Arusha Juu for a while with a Waarusha war Kingdom. After studying their military strategies, he returned to Siha and organized and trained the locals. He first prepared members of his clan before defeating the other two clans in Samake. His reputation grew, and the upper region recognized him as their chief. Later, he abdicated in favor of his son Maletua, who shortly after went from Samake to Wanri and was then poisoned in retaliation, most likely by a Kileo clan member.

Saiye of the Mmari clan, who lived in Komboko mtaa, south of Samake on the lower slopes, afterward received control. Kirema and Saiye had both been residing in Arusha Juu at the same time. He was taken prisoner by the Warush during one of their raids on Komboko and raised by them, where he learned their battle strategies and developed into a very skilled fighter. He promised his people not to worry about the Waarusha when he got home because he would teach them how to battle them. The elders concurred and gave Saiye several cattle to slaughter and feed to the populace. He demonstrated to them how to create defense trenches all around the nation. He then slaughtered other calves and challenged each fighter to chop a portion of the breast flesh that was spread out in front of them. Each one went and cut a piece, saying, "I'll be there for you until the very end."

Mangi of Siha
Mangi	Dynasty	Reign	Area
Mmdusio	Kileo	c.18th Century	Old Samake
Kirema	Orio	c. late 18th Century	Old Samake
Maletua	Orio	c. Early 19th Century	Komboko
Saiye	Mmari	c. Early 19th Century	Komboko
Ngalami	Mmari	c. Late 19th Century	Komboko
Lilio	Orio	c. Late 19th Century	Samke, Maene and Kichicha
Ngalami	Mmari	c. Late 19th Century	All of Siha except Wanri
Nkunde	Mwandri	c. Late 19th Century	Wanri
Ngalami	Mmari	c. Late 19th Century	All of Siha except Samake
Maimbe	Orio	c. Late 19th Century	Samake
Ngalami	Mmari	c. Late 19th Century – 1900	All of Siha Excpet Samake
Sinare	Kileo	1899–1900	Samake
Sinare	Kileo	1900–1905	All of Siha
Jacobus	Kileo	1919–1920	Siha
Malamya (ex Mangi of Kibsoho)		1920–1927	Siha
Simeon	Mwandri	1927	Siha
Abdiel of Machame	Kileo	1927–1945	Machame and Siha
Gideon	Nassua	1945	Siha
John	Nassua	1945–1962	Siha

The Waarusha sent news that they were intending to raid Siha one day as was customary for them. Saiye gave orders for his soldiers to paint they're shields and form a Maasai-like formation, just as the Waarusha did. He instructed them to allow the Waarusha to march directly into the trenches and prohibited them from engaging in combat before he gave the all-clear by killing a Waarusha. As a result, the Waarush was persuaded to enter the circular enclosures that had been built around each mtaa. When Saiye gave the order to attack, they became disoriented since they couldn't distinguish between one another. In the trenches, they were pursued and slain. At this period, Siha was still using short spears with tiny spearheads a little larger than one hand's width. Some of them were produced by local blacksmiths in Mae, but not enough to arm the nation; the majority of the weapons came from Usseri, and a few from Kibosho.

The Siha people have never invaded any other nation before Saiye's reign. On their initial raid, he took the lead. Mang'aro, a brother of Machame's Mangi Ndesserua, arrived in flight with a group of men. Saiye granted him a place to dwell at mtaa Mrau upon his request. Then, to usurp his brother's chiefdom of Machame for himself, he requested Saiye's assistance.

Saiye conducted two eastward attacks. On the first, he crossed the Lawati River and continued to the Namwi River (in what became the administrative headquarters of the Kingdom of Masama in the late 1950s), returning with a large number of cattle. With Mang'aro by his side, he ventured further on the second raid, into the Machame chiefdom by way of the Kikafu River's deep canyon. When Saiye and all of his troops crossed the river, Ndesserua told his warriors to hold off on attacking. They were soon surrounded, and because they had no idea how to get out, all but a few of them were slaughtered. However, some of them had managed to flee to the plain, turn west, and climb back up the mountainside to Siha.

This conflict bears Saiye's name because he was one of the victims. He is regarded as Siha's first truly legendary warrior. The adage "Why do you use force like Saiye who forced his people to fight and they were all annihilated in the Kikafu" is still used when someone uses force to accomplish something.

The nation descended into turmoil after Saiye's passing since only old males remained. Parts of the land were administered by clan elders. After some time had passed, they were chosen to serve as the Mmari clan's mangi Ngalami. He was Saiye's relative, the same age, and a Komboko resident just like Saiye. He initially had complete control over the entire nation, except Samake. This means that he had control over all of the lower mitaa, including Komboko, Mrau, Wanri, and Mae, as well as possibly the two upper mitaa that were next to Samake, Mane, and Kichicha,31 the remainder of Sumu being very sparsely populated at the time. Ngalami was expected to rule continuously for a very long period.

By taking into account the events in his rule that occurred before the arrival of the first German officers, who came after the officially recorded defeat of Kibosho by German forces in 1891, the beginning of Ngalami's reign can be dated as occurring most likely sometime during the 1880s (possibly though less likely as early as the 1870s). He governed until 1900 when the German government had him and other Kilimanjaro leaders hanged, giving him an uninterrupted reign of at least ten years.

Ngalami's power was occasionally unopposed. More often than not, he only had partial control over Siha, albeit the majority of it, while a variety of different individuals came and went in old Samake and once in Wanri, each of whom briefly exercised the mangi's independent rights there. The period is brought together by the continuance of Ngalami's rule. It is the second of the three periods that have defined Siha's history since the middle of the 19th century. The inhabitants of Samake choose Lilio of the Orio clan to rule them when Ngalami was first chosen mangi. While these two mangis battled it out for control of Siha, the first Arab immigrants arrived.

They arrived from the northwest in the direction of Ngare Nairobi, setting up camp for the first time just west of the Sanya River in the plain, close to where the current Siha District post office is located. They brought lead bracelets, iron wire, iron beads, fabric, and needles. The Siha people traded slaves and ivory. Later settlements were built higher up, amid old Samake, east of the Sanya in Komboko, close to the location of the current marketplace. A severe famine had occurred in Masailand before the arrival of the Arabs, and as a result, Maasai women and children had fled to Siha.

The Siha people sold them as slaves to the Arabs. Later, their mangis sold their people to the Arabs in exchange for weapons, cementing their supremacy. The first white person to visit Siha was with the Arabs during their second visit. When the Samake residents noticed the approaching wangers, they seized the boards they were using to build the protective trench around Lilio's country. The white man's askari blew trumpets. The townsfolk were alarmed and removed the planks to allow the party to enter.

Inquiring about the mangi, the white man. Lilio had retreated. His ancient cousin Kirema, a former chief, emerged in his place. After some persistence from the white man, Lilio emerged. Although gifts were altered, the white man's reason for visiting remained a mystery. After three days, his caravan descended and set up camp in Wanri. After that, it reportedly continued to Kibosho.

Kileo clan dynasty of Old Samake
Mangi	Regin	Area
Iranja	Unknown	Old Samake
Siria	Unknown	Old Samake
Kileo	c.18th Century	Old Samake
Maeda	c.Late 18th Century	Old Samake
Oseli	c.Early to Mid 19th Century	Old Samake
Mmdusio	c.Mid 19th Century	Old Samake
Sawoka	c.Late 19th Century	Old Samake
Mbira	c.Late 19th Century	Old Samake
Sinare	1900–1905	Siha
Jacobus	1905–1920	Siha

Nkini clan dynasty of Maene
Mangi	Regin	Area
Nkini	Unknown	Maene
Nandrie	Unknown	Maene
Mafua	Unknown	Maene
Marua	Unknown	Maene
Kisarike	Unknown	Maene
Mwangu	Unknown	Maene
Nsairo	Unknown	Maene
Jeremiah	Unknown	Maene

The Siha people had never heard of a white person living on Mount Kilimanjaro at that time, which was an interesting side note to the fact that while they had relationships with people as far away as the Usseri, they had none with their much closer neighbors, the Machame who lived across the Kikafu. Otherwise, they would have heard about Rebmann's and von der Decken's trips to Machame thirty years earlier in 1848–1849 and 1861, respectively. When Lilio was killed, the dynasty fell. He had murdered a Mwandri clan noble (Njamain Kichagga) in Mtaa Wanri. To exact revenge for his father's murder, this man's son Nkunde traveled along a high track around the mountain's base to contact his blood-brother Kinabo in Mkuu.

When he came back, he killed Lilio with the aid of mtaa Kyuu, who is now a part of Masama. Lilio belonged to the same clan as the Kibosho dynasty, the Orio clan. At that time, Mangi Sina, one of Kilimanjaro's titans, was at the height of his incredibly protracted rule. People from Kibosho duly arrived the day following Lilio's passing and spent one day feasting on pork. They subsequently made their way back to Kibosho, bringing Lilio's son Maimbe and his trusted soldiers with them.

Immediately, Mangi Ngalami seized the tiny chiefdom of Samake, and Nkunde appointed himself Mangi of Wanri. Some people traveled down to Wanri to join Nkunde since he was a fierce and well-liked warrior in Samake. We enter the 1890s under the control of these two mangis, Nkunde dominating Wanri and Ngalami ruling the remainder of Siha from Komboko. The Germans arrived sometime around 1891. The Swahili Funde, who had previously been to Siha with the Arabs, served as their leader.

The people who had traveled to Kibosho with Lilio's son Maimbe took part in the battle when Kibosho was conquered by the Germans, and they on their return home told the Siha people to take warning and offer no resistance when the Germans came. The Germans were well received by the two mangis, both at first when their authority amounted to little, and in later years when their authority had been established. Currently, Mangi Sina of Kibosho sought revenge for the murder of his relative Lilio. He was still powerful despite German occupation.

Mangi Shangali of Machame received some poison from Funde, who had been designated as a German government agent to keep him under observation, and he gave it to him with instructions to make sure Mangi Nkunde of Wanri was sent away. Mantiri of Nguni, who is now a member of Masama, was sent by Shangali to deliver the poison. Nkunde rapidly deteriorated. Then Sina instructed Shangali to send Nkunde to him at Kibosho. Nkunde stopped in Machame along the trip and asked Shangali to take care of his son Mwandi Simeon. He continued while being escorted, but was executed before reaching Kibosho. Simeon and his mother stayed with Shangali until Simeon reached adulthood and wed Ngamini, the daughter of the patriarch of Shangali's opposing branch of the family before they left for Siha.

Ngalami filled the void left by Nkunde's passing. He was in charge throughout Siha. Currently, Lilio's son Maimbe, who was sent back by Sina, took possession of old Samake. After some time, Maimbe left to ask Kinabo in Mkuu for assistance in keeping his authority, but when he arrived in Kamanga, a lion murdered him. The end of 1895 saw his passing. The phrase "it means nations do oust him ed for onside he" refers to the fact that after Maimbe's death, power was taken over by a member of a rival clan, Sinares of the Kilo clan. He was made mangi of Samake with the approval of de Kirema of Maimbe's own Orio clan.

The arrival of Sinare was to mark the greatest change in political power that Siha had ever known because, in less than a year, he would become mangi of not just old Samake but also of all of Siha. He has a lot planned for this century's final year. Before being summoned by the German authority to fight the Warush at Arusha Juu, like all other chiefs of Kilimanjaro, he had no time to be installed as mangi of Samake. Upon his return, he was installed in Samake, and shortly after that Mangi Ngalami was hanged by the Germans, and Sinare took his place.

It is unclear at this point if Sinare's ascension to power in ancient Samake resulted mostly from internal conspiracies or in part from outside influence, such as support from Machame, whose royal family Sinare was married into. The scenario is apparent in regards to the greater reward that followed, the chieftainship of all Siha. Siha, an isolated mountain region apart from the major political hotspots, was sucked into the central uproar like a minor piece in a big political puzzle.

Ngalami was overthrown for flimsy reasons like being at odds with an Arab named Mohammed who lived in Komboko and informed him of the German authority, refusing to distribute rice provided by the Germans during a famine because he believed his people would not eat worms, receiving a beating from a German officer after a fight with Nkunde of Wanri, and being accused by the Germans of plotting with the Masai to overthrow them.

The real explanation was that at the Battle of Arusha, Ngalami's destiny and succession had been decided on the battlefield. At that time, Mangi Marealle of Marangu, who was at the height of his power and enjoying the highest levels of German government favor, organized the successful operation that brought down his most formidable adversaries on Kilimanjaro. He made friends with Sinare there as one of the smaller parts of the situation, and they arranged for him to become the mangi of Siha. Sinare was simply a minor player in the overall scheme, and his connection with Shangali may be what gave him the support he needed to pursue his goals.

Sinare was given the order to have Ngalami arrested as soon as he arrived back in Samake after Ngalami's alleged treachery had been revealed to the Germans on the battlefield. He then dispatched his men to Ngalami's home in Komboko one day around midday. The residents of Komboko accompanied them and promised to fight for him when they had taken him into custody and brought him to the location of the current operation. Ngalami and one of his brothers were afterward transported over the mountain to Moshi, where they joined many other Kilimanjaro leaders and powerful men in being hanged. Shangali sent his troops to aid Sinare in maintaining order in Siha two days later. Arriving was the Swahili Funde, a close friend of Marealle and Shangali. He went to the installation with Shangali's soldiers.

Sinare eventually became Siha's mangi as a result. His election was a result of outside pressure. The possibilities of a member of his clan overthrowing the reigning clan at that point, when German power had already been established, were slim if it weren't for the plot. Nevertheless, Sinare barely managed to get in.

In terms of the various clans' claims to be able to lead Siha in place of the deceased Ngalami, the Mmari clan was currently the one with the greatest concentration of power and had previously appointed Ngalami and Saiye as rulers. In Samake alone, the Orio clan had intermittently appointed Kirema, Maletua, Lilio, and Maimbe, while Sinare's Kileo clan had a long way to go back to its previous single ruler, Mmdusio.

The Mmari clan's claims were the most compelling when examining Siha as a whole, whereas the allegations of the Orio clan ward Joonige were more compelling when examining old Samake alone. The Kilo clan's success under difficult conditions would have implications that could still be heard in Siha sixty years later. Ngalami's passing marked the end of a chapter in Siha's history. He was the final monarch selected by the Siha people and the one who, up to that point, could most nearly claim to have united all of Siha under his dominion. Since Sinare's arrival, their political fates in the 20th century have been largely determined by outside forces as part of the main political game on Kilimanjaro.

Siha as a whole became the unit as one chiefdom, but in the 19th century government in Siha had typically been divided between major people, two of them, each with his area of influence. The succession passed to rulers from a variety of houses without modification, possibly not insignificantly, but no fewer than five such houses, both inside and outside the chiefdom, shared the eight changes of rulership between 1900 and 1960. Siha's journey on Kilimanjaro was a singular occurrence in this last regard.

From 1900 until 1905, Sinare was the ruler of Siha. He held power from Old Samake, which was strategically located in the northwest part of the chiefdom, and held his supporters while being extremely inconvenient from an administrative standpoint. He was poisoned in 1905 by Nauru of the Mmari tribe in retaliation for the death of his brother Maanya. Siha fell into disarray after his passing, with all the unsolved succession disputes resurfacing. A party in the highest mitaa of old Samake desired the success of Jacobus, a young uncircumcised lad who was Sinare's son. A group in the lower mitaa desired Maanya's brother Tarawia, arguing that the Mmari clan had the right to reign in the same capacity that they did before Sinare's accession.

Mangi Sianga of Kibosho backed Tarawia, while Mangi Ngulelo of Machame backed Jacobus. On Kilimanjaro, no other partnership had a relationship as intense and long-lasting as that between these two outside forces. It was obvious that everyone would support the opposing position in any debate. While Kibosho had previously supported the rival Orio clan in old Samake during the time of Mangi Sina, it now naturally gave its support to the Mmari clan, given that clan's hostility toward Machame, which had actively assisted in the downfall of Ngalami. Machame had previously supported the Kileo clan in the person of Sinare.

The tragedy of Siha was that any candidate from the clan who would have received the widest local support had no chance of winning because Kibosho, who supported the clan and was the dominant force on Kilimanjaro in the 19th century, was now eclipsed and the new 20th-century power Machame was gradually taking the lead. No Mmari clan candidate had the opportunity to receive a fair hearing from the local German or British governing authority delegate, who made the final decision, in 1905 or later. It is no accident that the Mmari clan, which is widely dispersed not only in Siha but in neighboring Kilimanjaro nations, does not have a member residing in Machame.

Jacobus, afterwards known as Jacob, won election in 1905. He owed Mangi Ngulelo of Machame, who remained his ally, his throne. With one confusing interruption in 1919 when Matolo of the Orio clan assumed power but was swiftly ousted, Jacob's authority continued until 1920. Jacob continued to rule the chiefdom from Old Samake, and it appears that throughout this time the upper and lower mitaa had varying degrees of allegiance because he made no effort to appease the Mmari and Mwandri clans residing there.

He used force to keep the nation running. He is regarded as having been a strong and brutal king. He would ride his horse while tying the victim to it as punishment. He would beat you until the goat died if you offered him one that wasn't plump. He would ask someone to kneel when he was holding a baraza so he could sit on his back until the meeting was over. With whippings and far more gruesome sexual torment, he imposed his power.

Although Jacob's methods as a chief were not novel on Kilimanjaro, they were carried out with a thoroughness that finally prompted people to complain about him to the European authority, which was by this point controlled by the British. By 1920, signals that his power was waning successfully prompted Jacob to look for a reason to quit. Even if he was unpopular with the Siha people, Jacob was still a strong leader who refused to recognize any other Siha clan member as their chief, then or now. He was always expected to put the harmony of the chiefdom beyond his goals for his own family.

In actuality, it was this that threw Siha's subterranean order off balance and eliminated its chances of being dominated by its mangi. This is what is meant when it is reported that in 1920, the Siha people were unable to come to a consensus over their chief. Jacob used his influence to cause uncertainty when the people in the lower mitaa once more proposed Barnabas as a candidate from the Mmari clan. Major Dundas, who had just been commissioned as an officer at the Boma, was tasked with resolving the conflict. He appointed ex-Mangi Malamya of Kibosho to be the mangi of Siha after concluding from the evidence at hand that the Siha people were unable to govern themselves.

As he was considering ways to remove Malamya from Kibosho, Dundas made a decision that allowed him to accomplish two goals at once. Malamya had been one of the chiefs falsely accused of conspiring against the newly arrived British government in 1916, the second great engineered conspiracy on Kilimanjaro; after being deported and later vindicated, he returned to find another mangi, Ngulisho, ruling Kibosho in his place. To the British administration, his being there was embarrassing and posed a political threat to Ngulisho.

From 1920 through 1927, Malamya served as Siha's mangi. It is said that he reigned peacefully and that the populace was happy to have him as their leader. The fact that he was able to build his baraza in the lower mitaa of Wanri, the center of the chiefdom, where the Mari and Mwandri clans were dominant, while the upper mitaa Orio clan accepted him as a relative, lends credibility to this theory. Regardless of how he reigned, Kilimanjaro as a whole was about to see a change in fortune due to the appearance of a bright new star in the east.

The kingdom of Machame was assumed by Abdiel son of Shangali in 1923, and for the following thirty years, he would rule the political landscape with the full support of the British government and a steady buildup of power. The overthrow of Malamya was inevitable given the mutual animosity between his house and the royal house of Kibosho, as well as his imperialist aspirations to expand his dominion beyond Machame, westwards, and eastwards on the mountain.

In the meantime, Mangi Abdiel's father Shangali relocated to Nguni mtaa, Masama, which was conveniently located for him to sway events in his son's favor. This was just across the border from Siha. The chance arose in 1927 when Malamya was made vulnerable to allegations of cattle theft and incompetence over his cash box. After being ousted, he went back to Kibosho and was promptly poisoned. Simeon son of Nkunde of the Mwandri clan in Wanri was appointed mangi of Siha in his place; however, a few months later, he was compelled to retire using a similar scheme.

Mangi Abdiel wanted to rule Siha for himself, his father Shangali served as his agent to sway various local factions from his position on the ground, and Abdiel had the support of ex-Mangi Jacob who could muster a sizable faction in the upper mitaa and who preferred Siha to be ruled by Machame if it could not be ruled by his own Kileo clan. The intricate diplomatic game was now coming to a head. The argument put forth to the then-serving British governor, Mr. Hallier, and accepted by him was that the Siha people had asked Mangi Abdiel to rule over them because they had never been able to elect a chief among themselves.

Abdiel was able to sign himself as "Mangi of Machame and Siha" before the end of 1927. He then went on to covertly control Siha through his choice, a relative named Gideon s/o Nassua, who was given the unique title of the supreme headman, or Mchili Mkuu, to indicate his position.38 Gideon, a Machame native, was descended from a prominent and illustrious family that had repeatedly aligned its considerable influence with the interests of Mangi Shangali and his son Mangi Abdiel. He used the authority of the chief while acting as Mchili Mkuu. He ruled Siha with strength, success, and endurance from 1927 until 1945 without pausing.

He used a combination of force and statesmanship to whip Siha into shape. By treating every clan fairly, he put an end to the long-running intrigue that had been rumbling beneath the surface of the nation. His first move was to call together the top men of the rival clans and designate them as his advisors and local representatives. Being a skilled farmer himself, he toiled day and night to persuade the slackers who enjoyed dancing, drinking, and cattle to toil the field. When challenged, Gideon might claim that he lashed the people to get a better outcome. The lash was in his hand as frequently as it had been in the hands of his forebear Mangi Jacob but without Jacob's subtleties of cruelty.

Because practically little commercial cultivation took place before Jacob's time. Even though they were far from Kilimanjaro's heart, the tone of their lives had not changed much; they were still living in a 19th-century anachronism on the edge of the mountain's brand-new 20th-century world. They were cow farmers who enjoyed dancing at night and napping during the day while growing just a tiny amount of eleusine, beans, and bananas for their diet. Gideon forced them to plant coffee by forbidding any dancing, opening a nursery at his own expense, and dispersing seedlings for three years. He also produced wheat, forcing peasants to plant as many as thirty sacks of seed each season. The nation became rich.

Gideon made significant progress in a stable environment. Mangi Abdiel was delighted with his reign because he had nominal overlordship and was guaranteed Siha's vote on issues affecting all of Kilimanjaro's chiefdoms. Siha caused no issue for the succeeding district officials, which satisfied the understaffed British government in Moshi town. The residents of Siha were ultimately satisfied because they saw tangible advantages. The Siha people remember Gideon's administration with gratitude as the period during which their nation thrived and as the cause of their subsequent prosperity.

== Decline of Siha ==
Beginning in 1945, the British government, acting through the Provincial Commissioner of the Northern Province, officially elevated Gideon to the status of mangi to recognize his accomplishments and avoid any succession issues. Gideon abdicated in favor of his son John within a year. There are plenty of indications that Mangi Abdiel's local research into the likelihood of a Kilo clan member succeeding him and the thawing of his relations with him preceded his retirement.

Since 1945, Mangi ' John was in power. The smoldering embers of the previous clan wars. They briefly returned in 1945 over the tremendous opportunity presented by the succession issue, as they frequently did. Old Samake experienced intermittent flashing in 1954, as it had done so frequently in the past. This time, the same interests who had previously promoted the idea that the Siha people couldn't govern themselves now promoted the idea that it was time for Siha to be ruled by its mangi because they had a Kileo clan claimant in the form of Jacob's son ready.

However, the public's perception of the chieftainship institution as a whole was evolving, and the topic had lost some of its previous provocative impacts. Given the circumstances of the argument's revival, there is no proof that it was intended to accomplish anything other than irritating. There was no resolute counter-bid for the primary power during Mangi John's tenure.

== See also ==
- Chagga states
- Machame
