= Bwana Kheri =

Swahili explorer and guide

- Born: c.1810 Mombasa
- Died: c.1850 Taita Taveta County, Kenya
- Occupations: Explorer and guide

Bwana Kheri (born in the 1810s) was a Swahili long-distance caravan trader who lived in present day Mombasa. He is known for guiding the German missionary Johannes Rebmann of the Anglican Church Missionary Society (CMS) in late 1848 into the interior of the present day northern Tanzania.

== Biography ==
Kheri was a close friend of the Mombasa governor of the Busaidi Mazuri clan, who recommended him to Rebmann. Kheri was about to embark on one of his recurring trips to Mount Kilimanjaro with his own trade caravan when Rebmann decided to travel with him. Kheri was already well-traveled at this point. His expertise covered much of East Africa, from the coast inland to beyond the western border of Lake Tanganyika. Further investigation confirmed the accuracy of his findings, such as his assertion that the great lakes are different bodies of water rather than a single body of water.

The only other character comparable is the Swahili, Sadi, although he lacked Kheri's distinction and dependability. Kheri was the only 19th century guide of European travelers to Kilimanjaro to play such a significant role in Chagga history. Kheri was a well-established figure by the time Rebmann hired him in 1848; we don't know how many previous trips he had taken to Kilimanjaro, but we do know that he had been there throughout the reign of Mangi Rengua of Machame, who had died in 1848 and been succeeded by his son Mamkinga.

In 1848–1849, Rebmann traveled to Kilimanjaro three times, the first time visiting Kilema and the second and third times visiting Kilema and Machame. Rebmaan crossed the wilderness from Mombasa, stayed in the middle of the route at Taita, and then went directly to the mountain, skirting Taveta because Bwana Kheri was at odds with the Taveta king.

== First expedition to Kilimanjaro with Rebmann ==
In April 1848, before setting out on his first journey, Rebmann was warned by the governor of Mombasa, that he " must not asced the mountain kilimajaro, because it was full of jins (evil spirtits). For, said he, people who have ascended the mountain have been slain by the spirits, their fett and hands beens tiffene, their powder, has hung fire, and all kinds of disastrs have befallen them".

When Rebmann first viewed the top on May 11 from a distance, Bwana Kheri, who was with him as a guide and guardian, only described the white material as "beredi," or "cold." Therefore, Rebmann had to have learnt of the story of "Rungua, king of Machame, the father of Mamkinga, once sent a large expedition to investigate the nature of the snow" from Kheri and possibly other informants much later in the journey, possibly only after he arrived in Kilema. The only member of the group who survived was the one Bwana Kheri had seen with frost-bitten hands and feet bent inward from the cold had survived. The remainder were terrified and devastated by the cold since they believed that demonic spirits were to blame for the cold's effects.

== Second expedition to Kilimanjaro with Rebmann ==
Later that year, during his second journey, Rebmann stopped in Machame and found that the Chagga were aware that Kibo snow heated by fire turned into water, that they understood its nature and properties, and that rivers emanated from it. He also showed the Swhaili that the white covering could not be made of silver because it changed color with the seasons, and Bwana Kheri was persuaded, responding that the Chagga would not purchase lead armlets from caravans for this reason. The Swahili, not the Chagga, were the ones who first created the sliver narrative and its superstitious dread of the mountain, which they then disseminated around the coast.

Sometime in the 1850s, Bwana Kheri was killed while returning to the coast from one of his Kilimanjaro caravan trips.
