= Kibosho Kati =

- Town and ward
- Location in Tanzania
- Coordinates: 3°10′46″S 37°19′18″E
- Country: Tanzania
- Region: Kilimanjaro Region
- District: Moshi Rural

Population (2012)
  - Total: 10,258
- Time zone: UTC+3 (EAT)

Kibosho Kati is a town and ward in the Moshi Rural district of the Kilimanjaro Region of Tanzania. Its population according to the 2012 census was 10,258.
