= Machame Kaskazini =

Ward in Hai District, Kilimanjaro Region

Machame Kaskazini Ward Kata ya Machame Kaskazini (Swahili)
- Ward
- Kata ya Machame Kaskazini, Wilaya ya Hai
- Location within Tanzania
- Country: Tanzania
- Region: Kilimanjaro Region
- District: Hai District

Area
  - Total: 57.9 km^{2} (22.4 sq mi)
- Elevation: 1,388 m (4,554 ft)

Population (2012)
  - Total: 23,334
  - Density: 403/km^{2} (1,040/sq mi)

Machame Kaskazini is an administrative ward in Hai District of Kilimanjaro Region in Tanzania. The ward covers an area of 57.9 km^{2} (22.4 sq mi), and has an average elevation of 1,388 m (4,554 ft). According to the 2012 census, the ward has a total population of 23,334.
