= West Kilimanjaro language =

Bantu language of Tanzania spoken by the Chaga people

West Kilimanjaro
- West Chaga
- Native to: Tanzania
- Region: Machame, Kilimanjaro Region
- Ethnicity: Chaga
- Language family: Niger–Congo?: Atlantic–Congo; Benue–Congo; Bantoid; Southern Bantoid; Bantu; Northeast Bantu; Chaga–Taita; Chaga; West Kilimanjaro

Language codes
- ISO 639-3: Either: jmc – Machame rwk – Rwa
- Glottolog: west2852
- Guthrie code: E.621 (ex-E.61,62a)

West Kilimanjaro, or West Chaga, is a Bantu language of Tanzania spoken by the Chaga people.

== Dialects ==
There are several dialects:

- Rwa (Rwo, Meru, Kirwo), or Meru, from Mount Meru
- Mashami (Kimashame), or "Hai" (Kihai)
- Siha
- Kiwoso (Kibosho including Kindi, Kombo, Mweka)
- Masama
- Ng’uni

== Phonology ==
=== Vowels ===
	Front	Central	Back
High	i iː		u uː
Mid	e eː		o oː
Low		a aː	

=== Consonants ===
Consonants in the Mashame dialect
		Labial	Alveolar	Palatal	Velar	Glottal
Nasal		m	n	ɲ	ŋ	
Stop	voiceless	p	t		k	
Stop	voiced	b	d	(ɟ)		
Stop	prenasal	ᵐb	ⁿd		ᵑɡ	
Fricative	voiceless	f	s	ʃ		(h)
Fricative	voiced	β			ɣ	
Rhotic			r			
Lateral	glide		l			
Lateral	fricative		ɮ			
Approximant		w		j		

- /ɣ/ may also be heard as uvular [ʁ] in free variation.
- /β/ can also be realized as [ʋ] or [w] among some speakers.
- [ɟ] is found in loanwords.
- /h/ rarely occurs.
