= Battle of Kibosho =

1891 conflict near Kilimanjaro

- Part of the German Empire's conquest of East Africa
Date	12 February 1891
Location	Kingdom of Kibosho, German East Africa
Result	German victory

Belligerents
German Empire: German East Africa	Kibosho Kingdom of the Chagga states

Commanders and leaders
Hermann von Wissman	Mangi Sina of Kibosho

Strength
~800	~500

Casualties and losses
4	200

The Battle of Kibosho (kiwanja cha vita ya Kibosho, in Swahili) took place on February 12, 1891, in what is now Tanzania's Kilimanjaro Region, in Kibosho. The Kibosho Kingdom was ruled by Mangi Sina while the conflict was between the German Empire, commanded by Major Hermann von Wissman.

== Background ==
When Carl Peters decided to locate his "Kilimanjaro Station" in the non-combative state of Marangu in 1890, the German government had already arrived. Soon after, the Germans accidentally subjugated Sultan Mangi Sina to one of his vassals in an effort to organize their new area. This led to war with Kibosho. In response, Sina ran up the flag of Zanzibar and pulled down the German tricolor. On February 11, 1891, a German column led by Major Hermann von Wissmann left Moshi with three companies totaling about 300 native soldiers (other sources cite Rochus Schmidt, our primary source, as saying 380, but this seems excessive for three companies), nine German officers, and seven non-commissioned officers.

Flag of the Sultanate of Zanzibar c. 1890, flown by Mangi Sina

An army of 400 Chagga soldiers was to be provided by Sina's opponent Mandara of Moshi, also known as Mangi Rindi Mandara (Mangi Meli's father), to support the mission. The following units marched in formation: the first (Sudanese) company under Lieutenant Sulzer; the artillery detachment of one 37 mm revolver cannon and one Maxim gun; the second and third (Zulu) companies under Lieutenants von Zitzewitz and Prince; the ambulance corps and baggage (250 porters), with one section of soldiers acting as an escort; and the 400 Chagga warriors, under the command of Lieutenant von Eltz. The majority of the breech-loading rifles carried by Mandara's troops were Snipers, but they didn't want to engage in combat; instead, they planned to use their local knowledge to follow and seize the victory. They were divided into impromptu groups of undetermined size, each headed by a local chief carrying a German flag, and given white armbands to help them stand out from the enemy.

Between 600 and 800 men, almost all of them were armed with rifles, including a sizable number of breech-loaders, were under Sina's command. The Kibosho warriors actually had plenty of ammo, contrary to what the Germans had thought. The Kibosho location was made up of several ridges that were closely spaced and heavily covered in banana trees. Sultan's boma, an enclosure encircled by a wooden stockade and a ditch 3 m (9.8 ft) wide by 5 m (16.4 ft) deep, was located on the highest ridge. This contained a "maze of ditches, palisades, hedges, barred gates, pits, and other obstacles," as described by Schmidt.

These had been constructed piecemeal over many years, and the lack of a clear strategy greatly strengthened the fortifications since any outsider would unavoidably become lost in the maze. Since the entire region was densely overgrown with banana trees and the walls could hardly be seen at all from a distance, it was even impossible to observe the fort and organize an assault from outside.

== The battle ==
On February 12, the German column began its final approach along a forest trail that had been sprinkled with mystical charms by the defenders. Until they seen the askaris stepping over them without suffering any consequences, Mandara's troops were hesitant to pass these. They eventually got a good look at the first hostile position. In order to start "a lively fire," the Kibosho warriors dug deep ditches along the crest and cleared all the vegetation from one hill.

However, this was merely a weakly held outpost; as soon as the leading askari unit started returning fire, the defenders fled the area and vanished into the woods. The crimson Zanzibari flag was the only indication that the following hill, which was still forested, was Sina's main line of defense.

The 3rd Zulu company was in the left column, followed by the other two Zulu companies and the artillery on the right while Wissmann reassembled behind the ridge the enemy had just left. Skirmishers were placed in front of both columns as they moved forward simultaneously. They first noticed the defenses halfway up the following ridge, at which point they started to come under fire. Wissmann led his Sudanese company inside the fort before sending the second company in after them. He then battled his way around the inside of the fort's perimeter, engaging several defenses at distances of 20 to 30 paces apart in a series of firefights.

The 3rd company had also entered the boma in the meantime, and the two columns finally merged by moving in the direction of the sound of gunfire. After around two hours of combat, they came together in an open space in front of a stone structure that served as a sort of inner fortress and was still occupied by the enemy. Even though they had been forced from their positions, the other Kibosho fighters were not defeated; instead, they started to reorganize behind the fortifications that surrounded the square and opened fire on the Germans from all sides.

The Chagga auxiliaries that were intended to capitalize on the win were too far behind to become involved because the askaris were worn out. Wissmann was consequently obliged to retire and led his soldiers out of the maze using a strategy developed by the 3rd Company. Although it is unclear how it was employed, the revolver cannon was used to provide cover fire for the withdrawal. It appears likely that it had remained outside and had just fired wildly into the banana trees to ward off any pursuit. It can scarcely have been manhandled into the fort and over the ditches and palisades inside.

Wissmann was successful in evacuating every casualty, and the German losses to date were only two fatalities and eleven injuries. In order to supply defensive fire, he now reclaimed the Kibosho trenches on the first crest. Soon after, the soldiers of Sina tried a frontal charge, which the Maxim gun repulsed with great cost. The remainder of the afternoon was spent being harassed by Kibosho snipers who crept up to close range, fired, and then fled before the defenders could respond.

This activity ceased by the time darkness fell, but at midnight Wissmann gave the Maxim the command to fire a string of bursts in the direction of the boma. Although the fire could not be seen, it was clear from the enemy's "furious howls" that it had resulted in casualties. The capacity of the Maxim to cause damage even in the dark was a significant part in destroying the morale of the Kibosho side, according to later survivors.

However, the German scouts reported that the enemy had already begun repairing the destroyed portions of the boma early the following morning. Kurt Johannes instantly organized three Sudanese platoons into an assault group and they once more fought their way through to the center plaza. The third platoon, which literally tore down every obstruction in its path, was supported by two platoons of covering fire. Even while there was still tremendous resistance, it was far less strong than the day before, and Johannes' soldiers were able to storm the stone castle despite enemy fire. The houses within were set on fire, and the Zanzibari flag was replaced with the German one.

Following them were Mandara's soldiers, who had not yet participated in the battle, while the Kibosho warriors started to run from the citadel. The Sudanese successfully repelled a haphazard ambush as the Germans headed back to Moshi after rounding up hundreds of animals and all the weaponry they could find. Soon after, Sina dispatched emissaries to offer his complete surrender. According to Schmidt, the Kibosho army had suffered a death toll of roughly 200. Wissmann's force suffered a total of four fatalities and sixteen injuries.

== See also ==
- Battle of Moshi
- Great Hanging of Old Moshi
