= Mamka of Kibosho =

Queen consort of Kibosho
- Tenure: 1860s–1870s

Regent of Kibosho
- Tenure: 1870s–1873
- Born: Nuya Msele- Kiwoso c.1856 Foo, Kibosho Kingdom
- Died: 1954; Kibosho
- Burial: Kibosho Kingdom
- Spouse: Lokila of Kibosho
- Issue
- Father: Fischia Msele-Kiwoso

Mamka (c.1850s-1900s) or Mamka Msele-Kiwoso, also known as Mamka of Kibosho (Nkamangi Manka in Kichagga; Malikia mamka in Swahili) served as the first wife of Mangi Lokila of Kibosho from the 1860s to 1870. She never had any children, but she became regent to one of his sons after his death in 1870. She was his son's regent from the 1870s until 1890, and he died shortly after from smallpox. Mamka, who ruled for three years, is considered one of the most powerful women in Chagga history and is directly responsible for helping the ascension of Mangi Sina, one of Kilimanjaro's greatest leaders.

== Biography ==
Of Lokila's three wives, Mamka was the first wife and never bore a child. When he died, he left behind two young sons. Mamka became regent on behalf of a son who, by his mannerisms and skills, showed himself to be a future monarch. During her reign, she was regarded as the state's effective head even though she was never legally crowned queen.⁣

Born to Kiwoso's son Fischia, Mamka was descended from the Msele-Kiwoso clan, the oldest clan in Kibosho. She is given a unique place in Kibosho history, and is particularly esteemed for her intelligence.⁣

== Reign ==
According to accounts, Mamka governed for around three years. Her two right-hand men were Sawaya of the Mshiri clan and Mamboro, son of Matela, a descendant of Kirenga of the royal Orio clan. Old Tatua, Lokila's surviving father, picked them out for her. Mamka's greatest use of cunning as a queen was to ensure that the succession would go as she desired.

Because the Kibosho throne was left bare when Lokila's heir died from smallpox at a young age. Because he failed to meet the expectations of the throne, his other surviving son was disqualified. Three primary contenders remained: Sina, a young man from a distant branch of the reigning house who was already well-known for his fighting skills and was considered a rival under Lokila's rule, and Mamka's two right-hand men, Sawaya and Mamboro. Mamka herself supported Sina, whom she helped acquire the Kibosho throne through shrewd manoeuvring.

Mamka started by getting rid of Sawaya. Given his popularity and ambition, she gave a squad of her top men orders to assassinate him. They killed him with a spear one day as he was making his way home, and they took all of his livestock, some of which were held by Mamka and others by the men. Then, Mamboro and Sina were the options. Both belonged to the royal Orio clan, but Sina was a distant relative, and Mamboro was closer to the ruling line as Kirenga's grandchild.

Mamboro, being older, was spot on. Sina had escaped Kibosho during Lokila's reign because Lokila considered him a potential contender, endangering his life. In order to avoid being sent by the chief, promising young people from governing clans would frequently flee throughout Kilimanjaro from antiquity until the 20th century. Given that Sina led his own age group with the dexterity of a natural tactician and participated in all of Kibosho's raids, Lokila had seen Sina's fighting reputation as a danger to his own power. He had taken sanctuary with Mangi Kinabo in Marangu during the turmoil surrounding the succession.

Strong supporters backed both candidates. Nearly all of Kibosho's upper mitaa favoured Mamboro. Mamka, ancient Tatua, and the prominent members of the lower mitaa, especially in Mtaa Kirima Juu, where Sina's mother's clan lived, all backed Sina. Overall, it appeared that Mamboro had more practical support because, despite Sina's backing from the establishment in the form of the ruler and retired ruler, Mamboro had the crucial support of the upper Mitaa's longest-settled clans. If this turned out to be the case.⁣

== Sina's accession ==
Sina was signalled to return to Kibosho by Mamka and Tatua. He got into a fight with Mamboro when he got there. After seeing there was little prospect of success, Sina fled west to Machame in order to get assistance. In an effort to make Sina palatable, Mangi Ndesserua there gave some of his soldiers orders to travel to Kibosho. They had to return to Machame. Then Sina made the pivotal move. To visit the Msele-Kiwoso clan, the oldest established clan in Kibosho, who reside high up the hillside in ancient Mtaa Uri, he travelled back to Kibosho at night. He was successful in gaining their support. Their support and influence were crucial, and it's possible that they provided it in part because Mamka was a member of their tribe.

After that, Sina's followers engaged in combat and routed their rivals. Mamboro ran away to Mangi Rindi in Moshi, who subsequently had him killed as a courtesy to Sina. In Kibosho, Sina was installed as a mangi. Under extraordinary circumstances, he became the Mangi. It is remarkable that he should have succeeded without the assistance of other nations, considering the power of his opponent. His accomplishment was due in part to Mamka and Tatua's assistance and in part to his own extraordinary abilities. After the rise of Sina, Mamka's historical footprint remains unknown.

== See also ==
- Nuya of Machame
- Mangi Ndesserua
- Mangi Shangali
- Mangi Mamkinga
- Mangi Saiye
- Mangi Ngalami
- Mangi Rengua
- Mangi Meli
- Chagga states
