= Old Moshi =

Chagga state

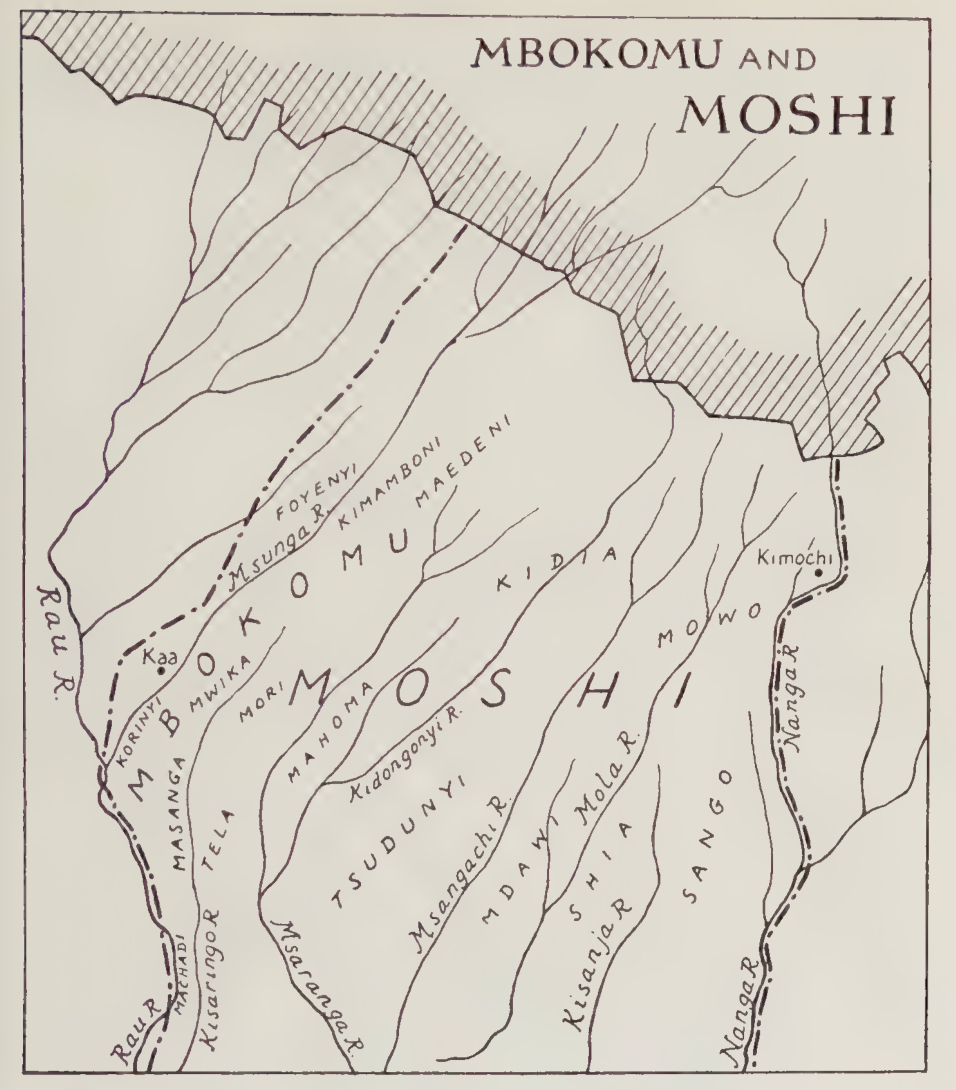
Moshi and Mbokomu, c. 1890s

Old Moshi was a Chagga state located on Mount Kilimanjaro; it included what is now Moshi in modern-day Tanzania.

== History ==
=== Foundation, rise, and German colonisation ===
Previously divided into nine mitaa (chiefdoms), in the mid-19th century Mangi Ndetia of the Tarimo clan (who came to power in Tsundunyi sometime between 1830 and 1845) extended his rule over Mowo and Mdawi on the upper slopes. The region was later unified by his son, Mangi Rindi (who came to power thanks to his mother Machaki's efforts), to found the Chagga state of Moshi, a process that was complete by the 1860s. Endangered by the large neighbouring Chagga states of Mbokomu and Kibosho, Rindi allied groups of Arusha who regularly raided his smaller eastern neighbours. After a failed raid on Usseri, Rindi and Machaki were ousted into exile by the mangi of Kibosho who vassalised Moshi; they only returned to rule with assistance from the Arusha.

By the 1870s Rindi had internally consolidated his rule; deeply unsettled by the frailty of his position amid the expansionist Kibosho, he sought safety in diplomatic manoeuvrers, and alliances to accompany that with the Arusha. Rindi learnt Swahili and made Moshi into a stopping point for Swahili traders, while increasing Moshi's exports of ivory and slaves in return for firearms. He also established relations with Tanga and Zanzibar on the coast. Rindi also hosted Christian missionaries and representatives of the German Empire, to whom he managed to project and maintain an oversized image as the most powerful ruler on Kilimanjaro.

In 1885, seeking to win favour with the encroaching Europeans, Rindi permitted the establishment of a Christian mission in Moshi and signed a treaty with the German government. However he saw his sovereignty eroded when in 1887 the German East Africa Company established a station in Moshi, and in 1891 when the German government extended its authority to Kilimanjaro. Rindi avoided military resistance, instead relying again on diplomacy, but while his prestige was retained, his power greatly decreased. Moshi became the administrative centre of German rule on Kilimanjaro. In 1891 he hosted the German army prior to their conquest of Kibosho, and died later that year.

=== Colonial and postcolonial eras ===
Mangi Meli came to succeed Rindi (his father) after his mother, Sesembu, and Kisanvu (a member of the royal clan) orchestrated the poisoning of the rival candidate. In 1891, the Germans relocated their administrative centre to the smaller polity of Marangu. Marangu's mangi, Marealle, fostered friendly relations with the Germans (whose occupation of Kilimanjaro did not necessarily appear permanent), and sought to provoke his enemy Meli into confronting them, just as the mangi of Kibosho had been subject to prior to its conquest. Marealle and his right-hand-man Mawalla secretly influenced the shooting of Albrecht von Bülow (the colonial administrator)'s messenger in Moshi, prompting von Bülow to launch a punitive expedition to capture Meli's boma. Having been spotted by scouts from Moshi, and knowing of Marealle's power play, Meli's warriors opened fire on the expedition before it could cross the Msangazi, killing von Bülow and many of his askaris. For around 50 days, the Chagga states on Kilimanjaro regained their sovereignty. Fearing a Moshi invasion, Marealle requested that the Germans send in an army, which arrived in July 1892 and conquered Moshi, in large part due to the use of machine guns. Meli surrendered and was forced to pay penalties and assist in the construction of the German administration's headquarters at the newly-established Moshi Town, while his eastern neighbours were placed under the rule of Maraelle.

Over the following years, Meli regained the Germans' trust. Marealle, who still considered the wamangi of Moshi and Kibosho his rivals, spread rumours of a plot to expel the German administration, involving the two wamangi among several other leaders. In 1900 on the orders of the colonial administrator, 19 people including Meli were executed by hanging and shooting at a tree by Meli's boma in Old Moshi.

== Government and society ==
The state was headed by a mangi (chief/king); in Chagga states the mangi was typically aided in governance by a council of lineage heads (njamaa) and district heads (wachili). Religious life was based in the belief and veneration of Ruwa (the creator god who resided at Kibo) and ancestral spirits (waruma).

== List of rulers ==
The following is a list of rulers (all of the Tarimo clan) according to Kathleen Stahl:

No.	Ruler	Reign	Notes
1.	Sunsa	? – c. 1830	Clan leader in mtaa Kidia
2.	Ndetia	c. 1830 – c. 1845	Son of Sunsa, expanded from mtaa Tsudunyi to control the mitaa of Mowo and Mdawi
3.	Salia	c. 1845 – c. 1850s	Reportedly poisoned Ndetia, later died in a gunpowder accident
4.	Rindi (first term)	c. 1850s – c. 1860s	Son of Ndetia, unified Moshi c. 1860, sent into exile after an invasion from Kibosho
5.	Kitori	c. 1860s – c. 1870	Brother of Rindi, ruled as a vassal of Kibosho
4.	Rindi (second term)	c. 1870 – 1891	Returned to power, Moshi reaches its apogee but is occupied by the German Empire in the years prior to his death
6.	Meli	1891–1900	Son of Rindi, executed by hanging by the German administration
...	...	...	

== See also ==
- Chagga states
- Machame
- Kibosho
- Siha
