= Great Hanging at Old Moshi =

German colonial war crime in 1900

The Great Hanging at Old Moshi was a mass execution that took place on 2 March 1900, during the German colonial occupation of Tanzania. 19 suspected Chagga, Arusha, and Meru leaders were publicly hanged and shot in Old Moshi for alleged conspiracy by German Captain Kurt Johannes.

Some prominent leaders that were executed were Mangi Ngalami of Siha, Mangi Molelia of Kibosho, Mangi Lobulu of Meru, Mangi Lebanga of Arusha, Rawaito of Arusha, Marai of Arusha, and Mangi Meli of Moshi, Mchili Thomas Kitimbo Kirenga and Mchili Sindato Kiutesha Kiwelu. The mass execution is considered one of the tragic events in Chagga history.

== Background ==
Throughout the 1880s and '90s, the German Empire gained control over the Chagga states on Mount Kilimanjaro. Initially having placed their headquarters in Old Moshi, in 1891 (after conquering Kibosho, the most powerful Chagga state) the Germans relocated their administrative centre to the smaller polity of Marangu. Marangu's mangi (king/chief), Marealle, fostered friendly relations with the Germans (whose occupation of Kilimanjaro did not necessarily appear permanent), and in 1892 influenced a confrontation between them and his more powerful rival Mangi Meli of Moshi; though Meli's forces defeated the expedition and killed the colonial administrator, the Germans sent reinforcements around 50 days later to conquer Moshi and regain control of Kilimanjaro. Meli was forced to pay penalties and to support the construction of a new headquarters in the newly-established Moshi Town, while several of his eastern neighbours were placed under the rule of Marealle.

Over the following years, Meli regained the Germans' trust, and together with Mangi Sina of Kibosho and Marealle they were considered the most loyal to the German administration out of the 40-odd Chagga leaders. In 1897 Sina died, reportedly having been poisoned on the orders of Marealle, and he was succeeded by Molelia. Despite Marealle's strong position, he continued to see Moshi and Kibosho as threats to his ambitions. Marealle began spreading rumours to the colonial administrator, Kurt Johannes, of a widespread conspiracy involving Meli, Molelia, and many other less powerful leaders to expel German rule.

== Events ==
Acting on the rumours spread by Marealle, Johannes plotted to execute all of the supposed traitors. In February 1900, he ordered all Chagga chiefs to accompany him with their armies on a punitive expedition against the Arusha. On the battlefield, men from Moshi learnt of the plot from an accomplice of Marealle (Mangi Shangali of Machame) and told Meli; plans were made to flee northward to Nairobi in British Kenya, however they were soon abandoned. Kathleen Stahl wrote that this may have been because the Moshi men were acting as double agents who dissuaded the flight, or because Johannes' approval for Chagga to raid the Arusha's cattle (after initially having disallowed this) was thought to contradict the rumours.

=== The trial and mass execution ===
Upon their arrival at the Boma, Captain Johannes imprisoned Mangi Molelia and his companions, executing one individual who attempted to escape. The following day, March 1, Johannes demanded that Molelia, Meli, and 17 other Chagga, Rwa and Arusha leaders and noblemen confess to conspiring against the German government. On the morning of March 2, these 19 individuals were executed.

On a tree that still stands near the Msangachi River, the accused men were hanged in front of the Boma. In front of everyone in Moshi and a few other kingdoms, they waited their turn to ascend the tree one by one. According to those who witnessed it, it was the most terrible thing they had ever seen on the mountain. Eyewitness testimony During reliving the incident in 1959, Moshi and Kibosho made a point of mentioning that Mangi Meli died bravely. This is a very rare instance of the Chagga using this term to describe any individual's deed. By 4:00 PM that same day, the Roman Catholic mission in Kibosho received notification from Captain Johannes that the executions had been carried out.

There was no pretense of a trial, as Johannes had already predetermined the guilt of the accused. This is evident from the events leading up to the executions. After imprisoning Molelia's group on February 28, Johannes informed the Roman Catholic Fathers later that night that he had appointed Molelia's uncle, Sianga, as the new chief of Kibosho. The next day, March 1, Johannes dispatched Sianga and Marealle, accompanied by troops, to Kibosho, where they occupied the mission for safety. From this secure location, Marealle announced Sianga's installation as chief, sending messengers in all directions to inform the community of the leadership change.

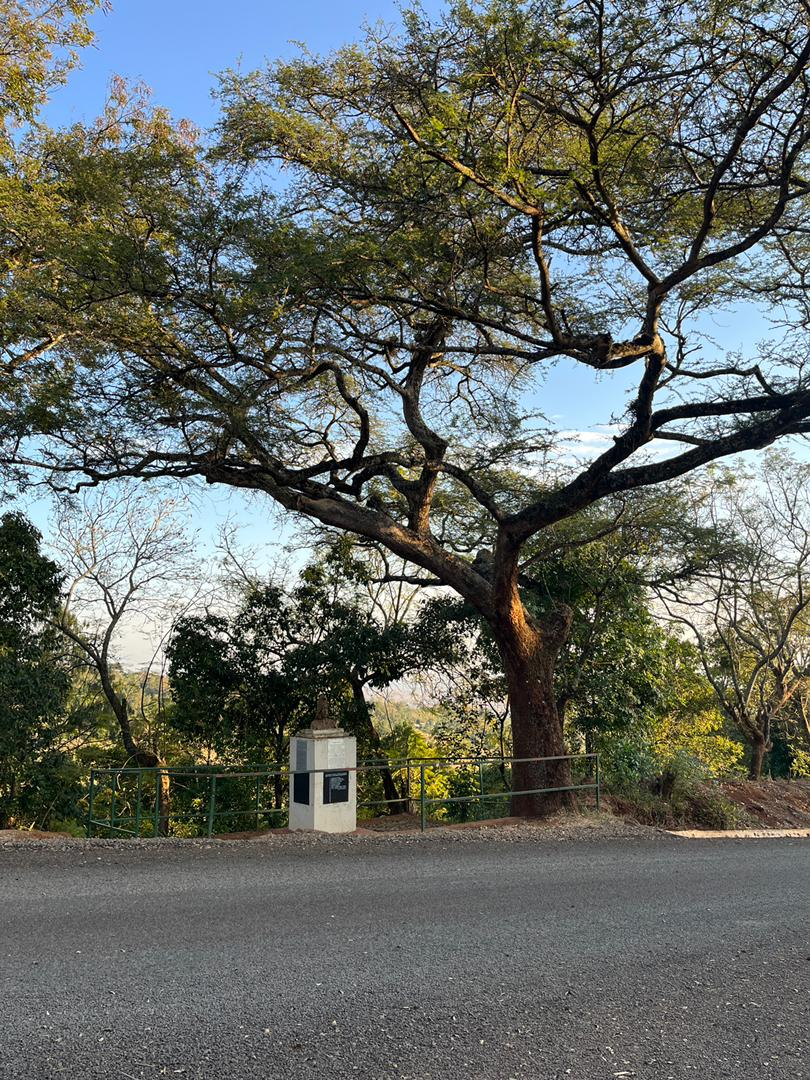
Tree with magi Meli Memorial, Moshi

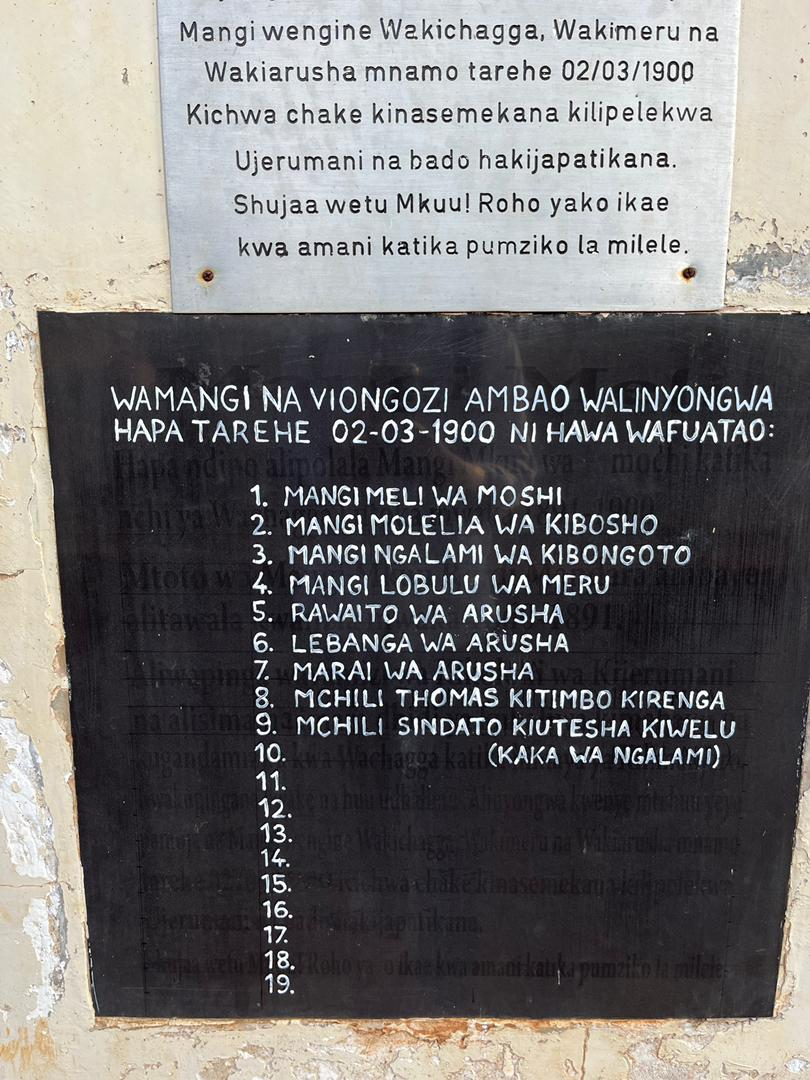
Plate with names of the executed Chagga leaders of Kilimanjaro, Arusha and Meru

== Aftermath ==
The methods and priorities of German and British colonial officers in Chagga diverged significantly. The German administration employed harsh tactics, including public executions and corporal punishment, which instilled a sense of fatalism among the Chagga, who were accustomed to the authoritarian practices of their own leaders. However, the Germans' use of open violence against local leaders was unprecedented and particularly shocking to the Chagga, who were more familiar with covert methods of political elimination, such as using a relative or wife to discreetly eliminate an enemy.

Despite their brutality, German officials were proactive in fostering economic, educational, and social development, employing skilled personnel in various fields, including medicine, agriculture, botany, and geology. In contrast, British officials, who arrived in 1916, did not govern through intimidation. Instead, they adopted a paternalistic approach, which subtly influenced the political dynamics among local leaders.

Significantly, the Germans' most notable mass hanging of the leaders in 1900 was a clear act of commission, while the British negligence of Kibosho represented an act of omission. As a result, the Chagga developed a fear of the Germans, which later shifted to a lack of fear towards the British administration.

== See also ==
- Chagga states
- Battle of Moshi
