= Kibosho =

Former Chagga Kingdom in Kilimanjaro c.1700s-1962

Kingdom of Kibosho Isarile ya Kibosho (Kikibosho)
- c.1700s–1962
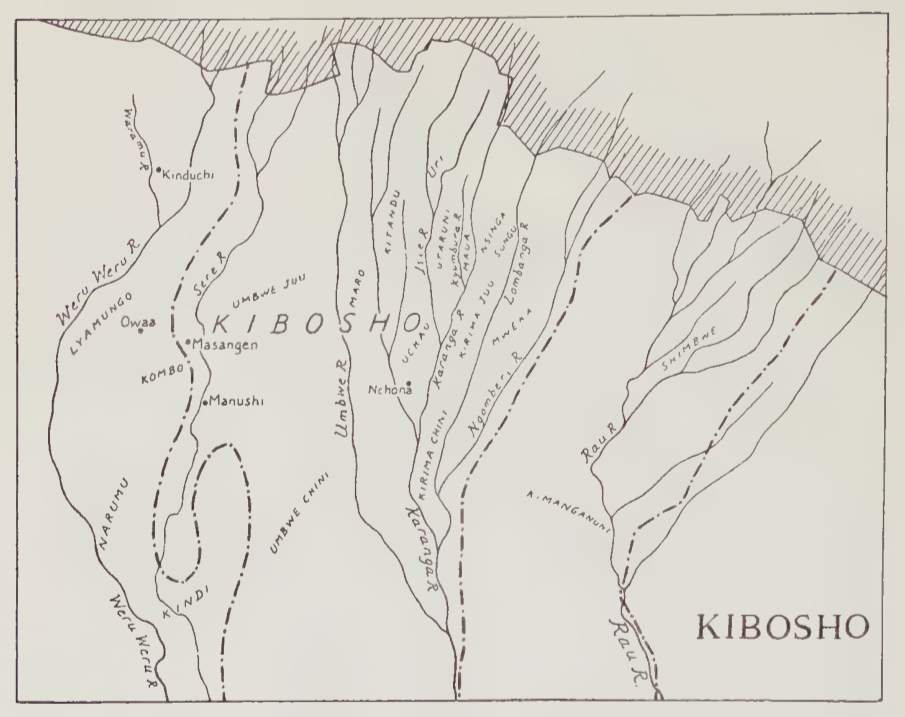
- Map of the Kingdom of Kibosho and its chiefdoms c1880s.
- Status: Kingdom
- Common languages: Official language Kikibosho Unofficial minority languages Chagga, Swahili,Pare,Shambaa
- Religion: African Traditional; Catholics ~70% by the 1950s; Lutherans
- Government: Monarchy
- Mangi (King)
  - c.1700s: Mangi yasanya
  - c.1750s: Mangi Orio
  - c.1780s: Mangi Kimboka
  - c.1790s: Mangi Iringo
  - c.Mid 1790s: Mangi Iweri
  - c.1800s: Mangi Kirenga
  - c.1850s: Mangi Kashenge
  - c.1861-1862: Mangi Tatua
  - c.1862-c.1865: Mangi Ngaluma
  - c.1860s-1870s: Mangi Lokila
  - c.1870-1875: Mamka of Kibosho
  - c.1870s-1897: Mangi Sina
  - 1897-1900: Mangi Molelia
  - 1900-1911: Mangi Sianga
  - 1911 -1917: Mangi Malamya
- Historical era: Pre-colonial era; Scramble for Africa; World War I World War II; Post-colonial era
  - Chagga states: c.1700s
  - Abolution of former nations: 6 December 1962
  - Formal abdication: 6 December 1962

Area
- 1890s: 89.25 km^{2} (34.46 sq mi)

Population
  - 1880s: ~30,000
  - 1900s: ~10,000
- Currency: Zanzibari rupee; Goldmark (1873–1914); East African shilling (after 1918)
Preceded by	Succeeded by
Chagga Chiefdoms	Tanganyika
- Today part of: Tanzania
- Area and population not including colonial possessions

- Person: Mkibosho
- People: Wakibosho
- Language: Kikibosho
- Country: Kibosho

Kibosho or Kingdom of Kibosho also sometimes referred to as Old Kibosho (Isarile la Kibosho in Kikibosho), (Ufalme wa Kibosho in Swahili) was a historic sovereign Chagga state located in modern-day Kibosho ward in Moshi Rural District of Kilimanjaro Region in Tanzania. Kibosho was situated on Mount Kilimanjaro to the west of the Karanga River. The word Mangi means king in the Chagga languages. Kibosho country's inhabitants spoke Kikibosho, one of seven dialects of the Chagga language groups' West Kilimanjaro language.

== Overview ==
All of Kibosho Kingdom was situated in the Karanga river basin, which is situated between the Rau and Weru rivers. This area was the first to be inhabited and has long been the kingdom's main core. The oldest clans and important settlements, Kirima Chini and Kirima Juu, which became well-known outside of Kilimanjaro in the early 19th century, are located in this hilly region, which is typified by at least thirteen rivers, including the Umbwe and Ngomberi.

A royal clan's migration from the west is a significant event in the Kingdom's history, impacting both local and wider events on Kilimanjaro. Ancient roads and streams connect the surrounding communities of Kindi, Narumu, Kombo, and Lyamungo, which are located along the eastern bank of the Weru Weru River. Historical occurrences have influenced these settlements, such as the arrival of Chagga refugees from Kilema in the late 18th or early 19th century as a result of raids by Mangi Horombo (Orombo) of Keni. A French missionary named Accoridngto Alexandre Le Roy visited Kibosho in 1890 and reported that the area had a number of small hills that formed several valleys and plateaus. The landscape of Kibosho is primarily south-facing and well irrigated, in contrast to the rough terrain of Moshi or the unique unitary structure of Machame. It is carefully cultivated in the area thanks to a system of irrigation channels.

The presence of blacksmiths' forges, women-tended fields, and kids herding sheep and cattle are characteristics of the area. Notably, Kibosho is distinguished by its artistically kept banana plantations, which are fostered using manure from cowsheds, a process that is somewhat uncommon in the African environment.

== Early history ==
The entrance of Yansanya, a member of the Kibosho ruling house, most likely in the 18th century, is when Kibosho's influence in Kilimajaro began. Three clans—the Msele-Kiwoso, Masawe, and Kulaya—are acknowledged as the oldest settled clans in Kibosho.

Having existed for five generations before the royal Orio clan arrived, the Msele-Kiwoso clan is thought to be the oldest. The Msele-Kiwoso are revered as a result of their long-time presence. Oral traditions of the clan trace their nine-generational genealogy back to Musie, their first progenitor. Notable early personalities include Kiwoso, who is linked to more thorough historical sources, and Ngiai, who was present when the royal clan arrived.

It is thought that Kiwoso came from Ukuni, which is situated in the upper Karanga river system, high in the forests above the ancient Mount Aura. He brought guns and livestock down the mountain, but noticeably without bows and arrows. Kiwoso first established the clan's permanent home in Uri, where he found no previous occupants, and then he moved close to the Isie river, a tributary of the Karanga.

Prior to the royal clan, the Masawe and Kulaya clans established themselves in Kibosho; the Masawe arrived later than the Msele-Kiwoso clan. Masawe, the first progenitor of the Masawe clan, came from Kibo and resided near Mount Maua at Mashe, near the Kyumbura River, seven generations ago. He first relied on hunting and wild crops, but he also brought cattle, goats, bananas, and yams. Eventually, his descendants relocated to the lower region of Mount Maua, down the mountainside.

According to the Kulaya clan, Kulaya, their first ancestor, came down from the sky in Mkola, Mtaa Uchau, west of the Isie River, and was followed by five generations. Kulaya opened the first market in Uchau, selling vegetables and eleusine with his wife and animals. Interestingly, Kulaya's son Mono-o-Ruwa, who subsequently became friends with the first progenitor of the royal clan, did not inherit his diminutive tail.

Unlike other clans in Kibosho that trace their beginnings from the east and west, the three oldest clans in Kibosho—the Msele-Kiwoso, Masawe, and Kulaya—do not mention a specific direction from where they originated, a detail that has been forgotten over time. Since the time of its ancestor, Kiwoso, from whom the chiefdom gets its name, the Msele-Kiwoso clan in particular has been notably present in its original site in old Mtaa Uri, close to the Isie river.

Due to its proximity to caravan routes or its affiliation with the royal Orio clan, who lived in the western part of the chiefdom before relocating to the centre, European travellers in the middle of the 19th century called the entire chiefdom Lambongo or Lambungu (anglicised to Lyamungo).The name Kibosho, derived from Kiwoso, was widely recognized in the central region and symbolized the historical significance of the Msele-Kiwoso clan.

In the early 1890s, Mangi Marealle of Marangu noted to German explorer Karl Peters that while other clans migrated to Kilimanjaro from areas such as Ukamba and Usambara, the Wakibosho had always inhabited the mountain. A significant turning point in Kibosho's history was the arrival of the Orio clan. The Orio clan, who came from the far west, moved slowly up Kilimanjaro and settled in Kibosho. Because of their resources and affluence, they soon became known as the royal ruling clan.

=== Origins and succession of the ruling clan of Kibosho ===
The Orio clan's entry in Kibosho was significant because, because to their wealth, they were soon acknowledged as the royal governing clan. Starting from Olmulelia in east Arusha along the Mbatian path, the clan moved across Kilimanjaro from the far west under the leadership of their first ancestor, Yansanya. Before continuing eastward along the high top track, Yansanya first established temporary settlements at Siha, Kinduchi, Owaa, Marawa, and Nchona, all of which developed into important shrines. Mono-o-Ruwa greeted him when he arrived at Uchau and met the Kulaya tribe.

Yansanya's riches and resources allowed him to be accepted as the leader of the surrounding tribes, and he was accompanied by several women, children, and livestock. Thanks to his ability to negotiate and the availability of land, his leadership encountered no resistance. Two settlement groups were beyond Yansanya's direct sphere of influence during this time: the Masawe and Kwai clans in the upper Lyamungo region, and the Kindi, Kombo, and Narumu clans to the west. The oldest chiefdom, Mweka, was located to the east and was governed by the Tarimo clan.

Later settlers from both the east and the west embraced Yansanya's leadership, which resulted in the founding of the Orio dynasty of Kibosho, which has lasted through seventeen reigns from the 18th century to the present.

== Kings of Kibosho ==
The succession of the Orio dynasty and Kings of Kibosho;

- Yasanya (founder of the ruling dynasty); established the kingdom in the early 18th century
- Orio (son of Yansanya); Rules in the mid 18th century.
- Kimboka (son of Yansanya); rules in the late 18th century
- Iringo (son of Orio); rules in the late 18th century
- Iweri (son of Kimboka) rules in the late 18th century
- Kirenga (son of Iweri); rules in the early 19th century during Mangi Rengua's reign in Machame. He establishes another settlement called Kirima Juu west of Karanga River.
- Kashenge (son of Irenga); rules in the early 19th century considered as one of the greatest kings in Kibosho.He also rules during Mangi Rengua's reign in Machame when Rengua slaughters the young initiates at Kinduchi.
- Tatua (son of Kashenge); rules in 1861 as recorded by von der Dicken, he is considered a warrior King. He sacked Uru amongst many Chagga countries and was also feared by Mangi Ndesserua of Machame.He retires in 1862 to his son Ngaluma.
- Ngaluma (Son of Tatuta); rules in 1862 for a few years. He is remembered for being in ill-health and not sacking any other settlements.
- Lokila (son of Tatuta); also considered one of the greatest kings in Kibosho. He rules during the late 1860s to early 1870s. He is one of the few kings that physically went on raids. He sacked Uru and created the tradition of sacking Uru for slaves to work in Kibosho and also to sell to the Arab and Swahili caravans. He made Mwika and Uru his vassal states with annual tributes from them. He deposed existing chiefs in raided areas with his own Orio clan members. He is remembered for defeating Mangi Rindi of Moshi and became the most power king in Kilimajaro.
- Mamka (wife of Lokila); first female ruler and regent of Kibosho. remembered as competent head of state due to her remembered and respected intelligence. She was from the oldest clan in Kibosho, the Msele-Kiwoso. She is said to have ruled for three years.
- Sina (son of Kisaro); considered the greatest ruler of Kibosho, ruled from 1870s to 1897
- Molelia (son of Sina); ruled 1897–1900, hanged by the German authority at the Great Hanging at Old Moshi in 1900.
- Sianga (son of Kisaro); ruled 1900-ca.1911
- Malamya (son of Sianga); ruled 1911-197 and deported to Kisamayo by the British colonizers in 1917 and then returned and reinstated as mangi of Siha in 1927.
- Barnabas Ngowi (Moshi Boma clerk); ruled Kibosho for a few months under British instructions.
- Ngulisho (Son of Sina); ruled 1917–1946
- Alex (Son of Ngulisho); last Kibosho King, ruled from 1946 to 1962.

== Kibosho chiefdoms and colonies ==
A centralised administrative structure relied heavily on the king-appointed chiefs of the mitaa. Although these chiefs reported to the king, their positions were shaped by their connections to regional families, which occasionally resulted in political rivalry. The royal family responded by taking action to resolve these conflicts.

The chiefs' duties included overseeing corvée labour, managing local tribunals, and collecting local taxes. This arrangement preserved allegiance to the king's central authority while facilitating efficient local control.

The following is a list of Kibosho colonial possessions over its 300-year history, along with major chiefdoms (Mitaa). The communities are grouped between the Rau River to the east and the Weru Weru River to the west.

- Chiefdom of Lyamungo; also known as Lambungu or Lyamungo, is named after its western area near Weru Weru. This name likely reflects its position on a caravan route or its historical connection to the royal Orio clan of Kibosho, which previously lived there before moving to the chiefdom's center in Owoo. When Mangi Horombo began to raid in the late 1700s, it served as a haven for a significant number of immigrants from the Kingdom of Kilema. After staying for a while, they returned home.
- Chiefdom of Narumu; despite being under the Kingdom of Kibosho. The dialects and traditions of the chiefdom are more similar to those of the western Kingdom of Machame. The pottery produced in the chiefdom is well-known.
- Chiefdom of Umbwe Chini; this chiefdom is where Nassua and Shangali sought refuge from Mangi Sina.
- Chiefdom of Kombo; during its time as a colony, Kombo was forced to adopt the customs and language of the Kibosho. Also in the late 1700s, when Mangi Horombo raided, and as a haven for a significant number of immigrants from the Kingdom of Kilema. They spend some time there before going back home.
- Chiefdom of Maro; ancestral home to the ruling Olutu and Malya clans that Mangi Sina almost wiped out as they saw them as rivals in the 1870s.
- Chiefdom of Uchau; The Kulaya clan originates from their first ancestor, Kulaya, who is believed to have descended from the sky at Mkola in mtaa Uchau of Kibosho. Accompanyied by his wife and livestock, Kulaya founded the area's first market, selling grains and vegetables. He was known for a small tail, which his son, Mono-o-Ruwa, did not inherit. Mono-o-Ruwa later befriended the first ancestor of the royal clan. Yansanya also settles here at Nchona from Manushi.
- Chiefdom of Utaruni; home to Mangi Sina, where he moved to Maua during the 1870s.
- Chiefdom of Maua; The Massawe clan initially settled in the chiefdom in the village of Mashe, which has a pond in the Kyumbura River. According to legend, Massawe brought his wife, goats, cattle, yams, bananas, and masale with him, as well as tiny spears devoid of bows or arrows. His descendants eventually relocated to Maua's southern region, close to the Karanga River.
- Chiefdom of Nsinga; home of the Shuo (Shio) clan, who came from the east to settle there.
- Chiefdom of Sungu home of the Chuwa clan, also one of the first places Yansanya settled before moving to Kirima Juu.
- Chiefdom of Uri; As one of the primary settlements of Msele-Kiwoso, who initially came from Ukumi in Kibo, it is regarded as one of the oldest settlements in Kibosho.
- Chiefdom of Mweka ; the oldest chiefdoms in the area. Mweka was governed by a chief from the Tarimo clan, whose first ancestor, Ntesha, is believed to have originated from the east, possibly the Kamba plains. Ntesha gradually traversed the Uru region before settling in Mweka, where he established the ruling house of the clan.
- Chiefdom of Kirima Juu; considered one of the leading chiefdoms of Kibosho, was established by Mangi Kirenga as the population of Kirima Chini increased.
- Chiefdom of Kirima Chini; located south of Kirima Juu, was also one of the leading chiefdoms of Kibosho with its capital, Nchona, where Yansanya lived, bore his children, and died there. Mrenyi, son of Yansanya, built extensive trenches around the chiefdom to protect it from raids from the Warusha.
- Chiefdom of Manushi; Yansanya, the first ancestor to the royal Orioc clan, settles here at the village of Marawa after staying in Kinduchi.
- Kibosho Colony of Uru juu (Shimbwe); Eventually united with Uru chini to become a Unified kingdom in the 20th century.
- Kibosho Colony of Uru Chini (Kimanganuni); United with Uru Juu to become a separate kingdom in the 20th century. Kimanganuni becomes the center of the Uru Kingdom.
- Kibosho Colony of Kindi; Lost a lot of its residents to Arusha Juu (modern-day Arusha) fleeing Mangi Lokila and settled there. During its time as a colony, Kindi was forced into assassinating Kibosho cultures and languages.
- Kinduchi; a major settlement located in Lyamungo Chiefdom where the ancestor of the royal clan Yansanya first settled, coming from Siha in the west. This settlement is also the location of Mangi Sina's infamous young initiates massacre in the 19th century.

== Kibosho's golden age ==
The Kingdom of Kibosho went through a period of tremendous power expansion after Baron von der Decken's 1861–1862 voyage to Kilimanjaro. Kibosho's monarchs maintained contacts with coastal cities, sent their own emissaries to Zanzibar, and interacted with Swahili caravans and elephant hunters. The chiefdom had comparatively little contact with Europeans in spite of these exchanges with Arab traders.

Kibosho stood apart among the dominant Kilimanjaro kingdoms of the 19th century in that European intervention had the least impact on its renown. This background deepens an oral story in Kibosho that states that during Kashenge's rule, the first white man to visit the area was probably the missionary Johannes Rebmann. He was warmly referred to "Pololo," which translates to "Peaceful," because he didn't cause any trouble.

As the most powerful leader on Kilimanjaro in the 1880s, Mangi Sina of Kibosho inspired dread and jealousy among other chiefdoms. As a result, opposing leaders temporarily allied together against him, strengthening their bonds and reducing Sina's power. These chiefs banded together to deceive European colonizers about Kibosho's actual strength because of concern that Sina's stature would rise if his strength was acknowledged.

Mangi Rindi of Moshi was another important character who, like Sina, used cunning diplomacy to acquire outside assistance against Kibosho. Rindi effectively positioned himself as the "King of all Jagga" and deflected European attention from Kibosho by forming relationships with the Warush, Swahili traders, and Europeans starting in 1862. In 1891, Sina and the occupying Germans fought the Battle of Kibosho; the Germans won, and Kibosho began a period of gradual decline. Notable Mangis by the late 19th century were Sina, Rindi, and Marealle of Marangu; Marealle's rise to prominence was primarily a result of his partnership with the German government.

== Impact of the hanging of Mangi Molelia ==
Having already experienced the poisoning of their King Sina in 1897, the hanging of Molelia in 1900 was a catastrophic event for the Kibosho Kingdom.These events were planned by Mangi Marealle of Marangu, and Kibosho suffered heavy casualties as a result, including the loss of numerous skilled leaders. The Kibosho people were very saddened by the executions and held Marealle accountable for his part.

Because of these acts, Kibosho's authority was greatly reduced, and Marealle was able to defeat the chiefdom on his own. The balance of power was further shifted when Sianga, who had helped Marealle, was named chief of Kibosho. As Kibosho declined, nearby chiefdoms such as Marangu, Machame, and Uru profited.

From the German government's perspective, this situation allowed them to manage a weaker chief in Kibosho. The Chagga, however, consider Captain Johannes's mass hangings to be among the most horrifying events in Kilimanjaro's history. Although Marealle was mostly to blame, Captain Johannes was ultimately held accountable for the incident and the subsequent appointment of Sianga, which helped to divert Kibosho's ire from the colonial government.

== Decline ==
The Kibosho chiefdom had a period of collapse after 1900, during which time its resources and power significantly diminished. Sianga, who was forced to become chief, had difficulties all during his rule. The immediate result of Kibosho's decline was the loss of its large livestock wealth, which had previously been accumulated by chiefs Sina and Molelia. This riches was taken by people who farmed in nearby Machame and Uru on Kibosho's behalf.

According to Chagga tradition, when Sianga ascended, he seized property and animals from Molelia's family. As a requirement of his appointment, Captain Johannes had ordered Sianga to surrender any Molelia followers, or ideally their hearts. He also commanded that the chief's defences in Kibosho be destroyed, signifying the diminished status of the chiefdom. In March 1900, Lieutenant Merker oversaw the burning of the chief's residence, further signaling the decline.

The mood in Kibosho was one of mourning, and the relationship between the community and their new chief, as well as the German authorities in Moshi, was strained. Sianga's attempt to deliver three enormous elephant tusks, six bulls, 73 firearms, and 21 bags of powder to the Moshi Boma was a noteworthy event, but he was unable to find any Kibosho people who would follow him. In the end, he turned to the local mission for support, and they sent one of their own Chagga staff to accompany him.

== Legacy ==
Once home to some 30,000 people and rich in agricultural resources, Kibosho was a prominent chiefdom on Kilimanjaro but was mostly disregarded by colonial authority. The failure to utilise the potential of the Kibosho people, who were mostly unaffected by modernisation in comparison to other areas, is regarded as one of The British administration's most important mistakes on the mountain.

Kibosho's 19th-century contacts with Europeans are historically reflected in this neglect, with the only continuous encounter occurring through the Roman Catholic mission founded in 1893. The Catholic Fathers and nuns have played a major role in shaping the Kibosho community's perception of European life. Due to this influence, paganism and Catholicism have created a distinctive cultural synthesis that frequently shows up as conflict or communal merging.

Kibosho's rich tradition and dense population have produced a more intense mix of beliefs than other Catholic-influenced areas on Kilimanjaro, such Uru and Kilema. By 1960, nearly every household in Kibosho included a young Catholic alongside pagan family members, and Catholics held a majority on the local area council.

Even in the 19th century, Kibosho's agricultural methods were superior to those of many other Chagga chiefdoms, demonstrating its fertility and tradition of expert agriculture. Kibosho residents are known for their pride in their cultural history and intelligence.

== See also ==
- Chagga states
- Machame
- Siha
