= Mangi Meli =

Meli
- Mangi of Moshi
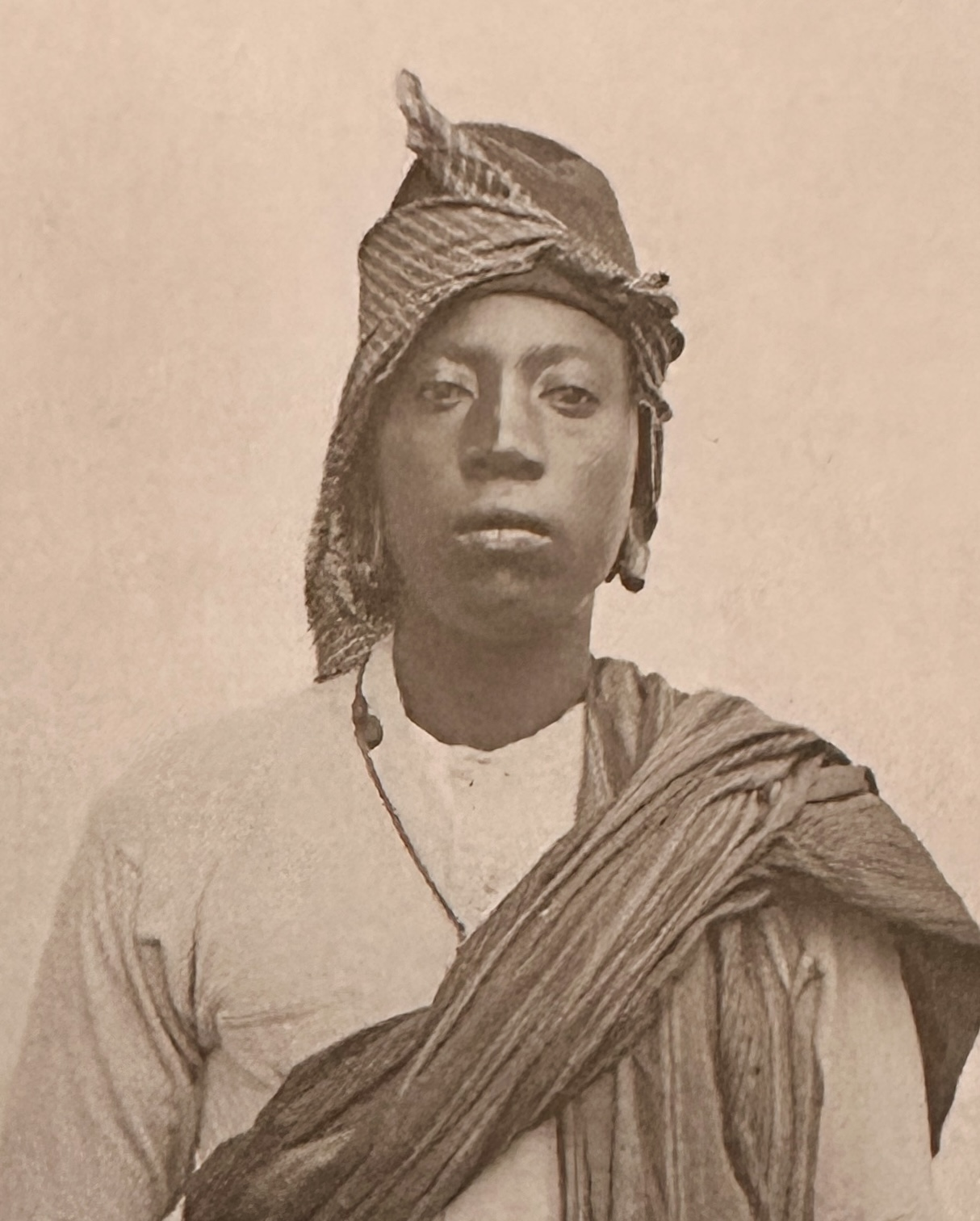
- Photo of Mangi Meli c. 1890s

King of Moshi
- Reign: 1891 – 02 March 1900
- Predecessor: Rindi Mandara of Moshi
- Successor: Salema of Moshi
- Born: 1866; Moshi District, Kilimanjaro Region
- Died: March 2, 1900; Moshi District, Kilimanjaro Region.
- Burial: Unknown; Unburied, his remains never found
- Issue (among others): Sudi
Names
- Meli Kiusa bi Rindi Makindara
- Father: Rindi Mandara
- Mother: Sesembu of Kilema
- Religion: Traditional African religions

Meli or Mangi Meli Kiusa bin Rindi Makindara (1866 – 2 March 1900), also known as (Mangi Meli of Moshi), (Mangi Meli in Kichagga), (Mfalme Meli, in Swahili) was a king of the Chaga in Moshi, one of the sovereign Chagga states in the late 1890s. Mangi means king in Kichagga. He was hanged by the German colonial government together with 19 other Chagga, Meru, and Arusha leaders. Thomas Kitimbo Kirenga, Sindato Kiutesha Kiwelu, King Ngalami of Siha, Tanzania, King Lolbulu of Meru, King Rawaito of Arusha, King Marai of Arusha, and King Molelia of Kibosho were among the noblemen on 2 March 1900.

== Rise to power ==
Born in 1866, Mangi Meli was the first child of Mangi Rindi's second marriage to Sesembu, a Kilema noblewoman. Upon Rindi's passing in 1891, which was kept a secret until the succession dispute was settled. The first son of Rindi's first wife, Kirita, and the first son of his second wife, Meli, were competitors. The residents of the west bank of the Msangachi River helped assist Kirita while he lived there. Like his own father in his boyhood, Meli lived on the east side of it and received his best support from that side. Sesembu, Meli's mother, had Kisanvu of the royal dynasty as her right-hand man. They conspired together to poison Kirita and then strangle him to death. Although the dispatch of royal opponents was widespread throughout Kilimanjaro, this incident was one of many that were later utilized as a political tool to attack a branch of the ruling family. This was because it was claimed long after the fact that Kirita's murder had cursed the conspirators. In 1891, Meli then succeeded as mangi of Moshi.

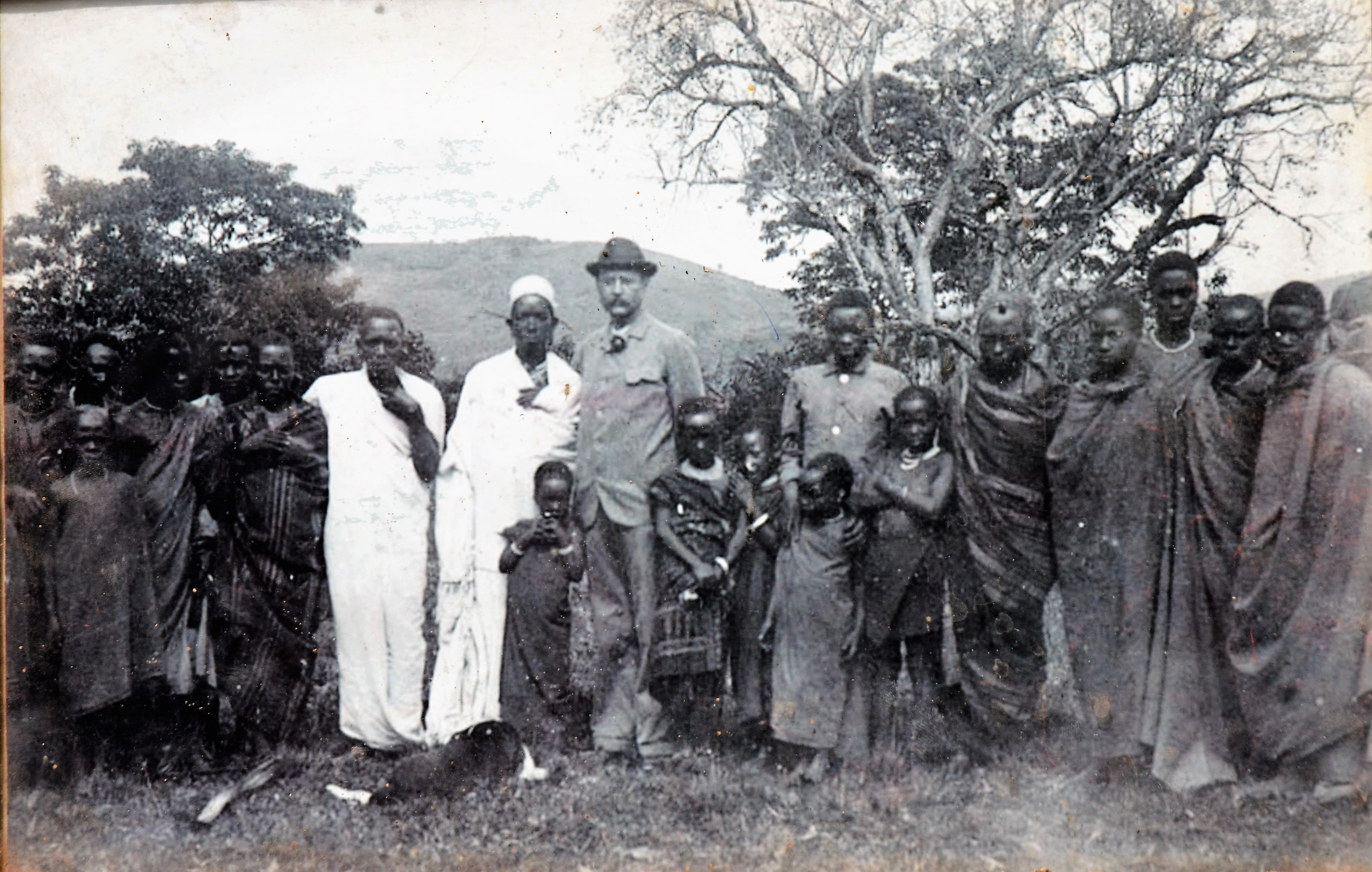
Meli as boy standing next to Dr.Hans Meyer visiting the Meli family before his Kilimanjaro ascent

Young, smart, exuberant, and impulsive, Mangi Meli resembled his father in many ways when he assumed the throne thirty years previously. But, the major change in 1891 was that the Europeans were now in charge of Kilimanjaro. Although the actuality of German power was made evident by the invasion of Kibosho, the Chagga were not yet aware that the German government's occupation was a long-term one. Yet, the presence of German officers and askaris served as a constant reminder of the new conditions.

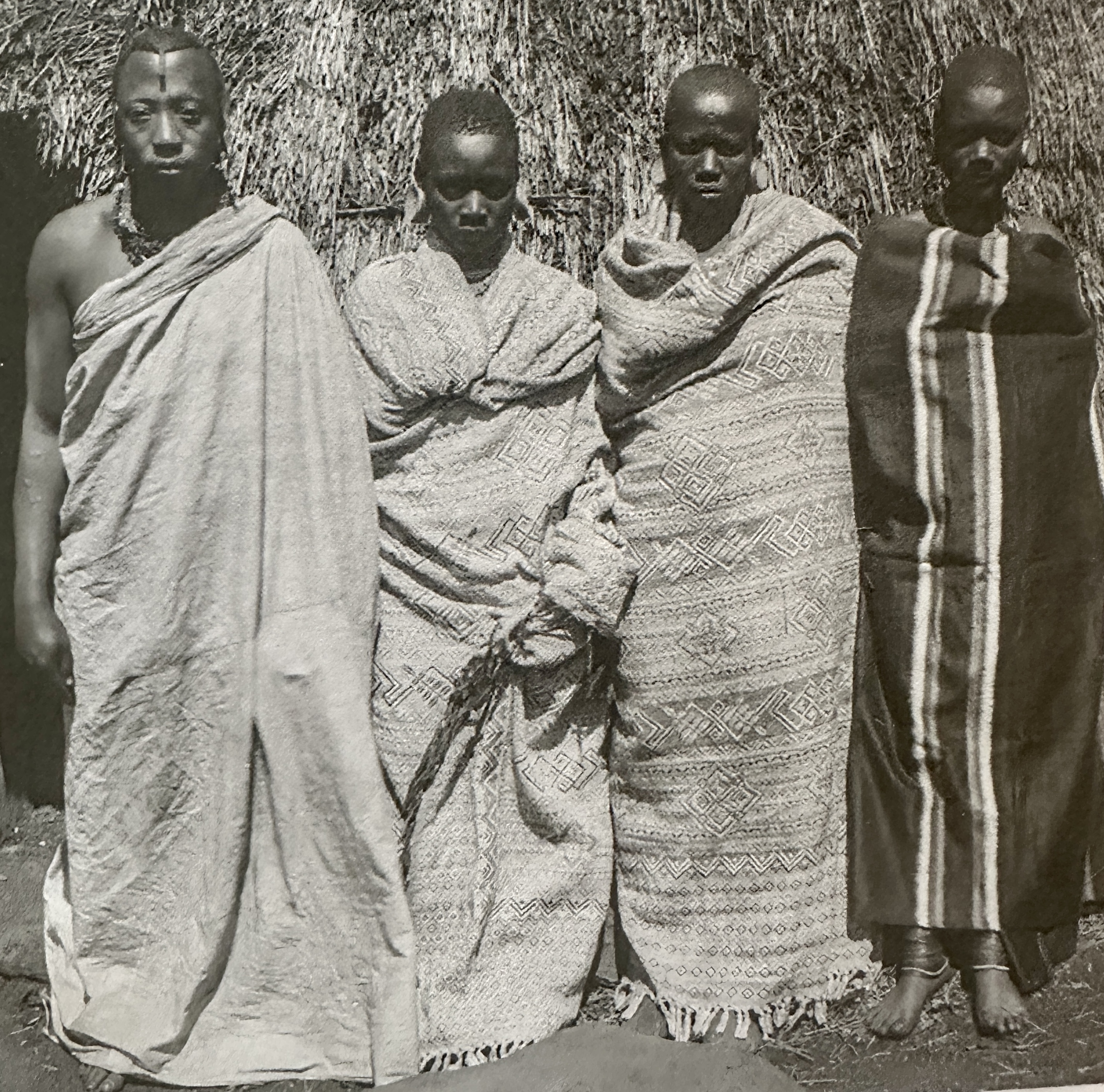
Mangi Meli and his wives, his youngest wife Masinde is on the right c.1898 in Moshi

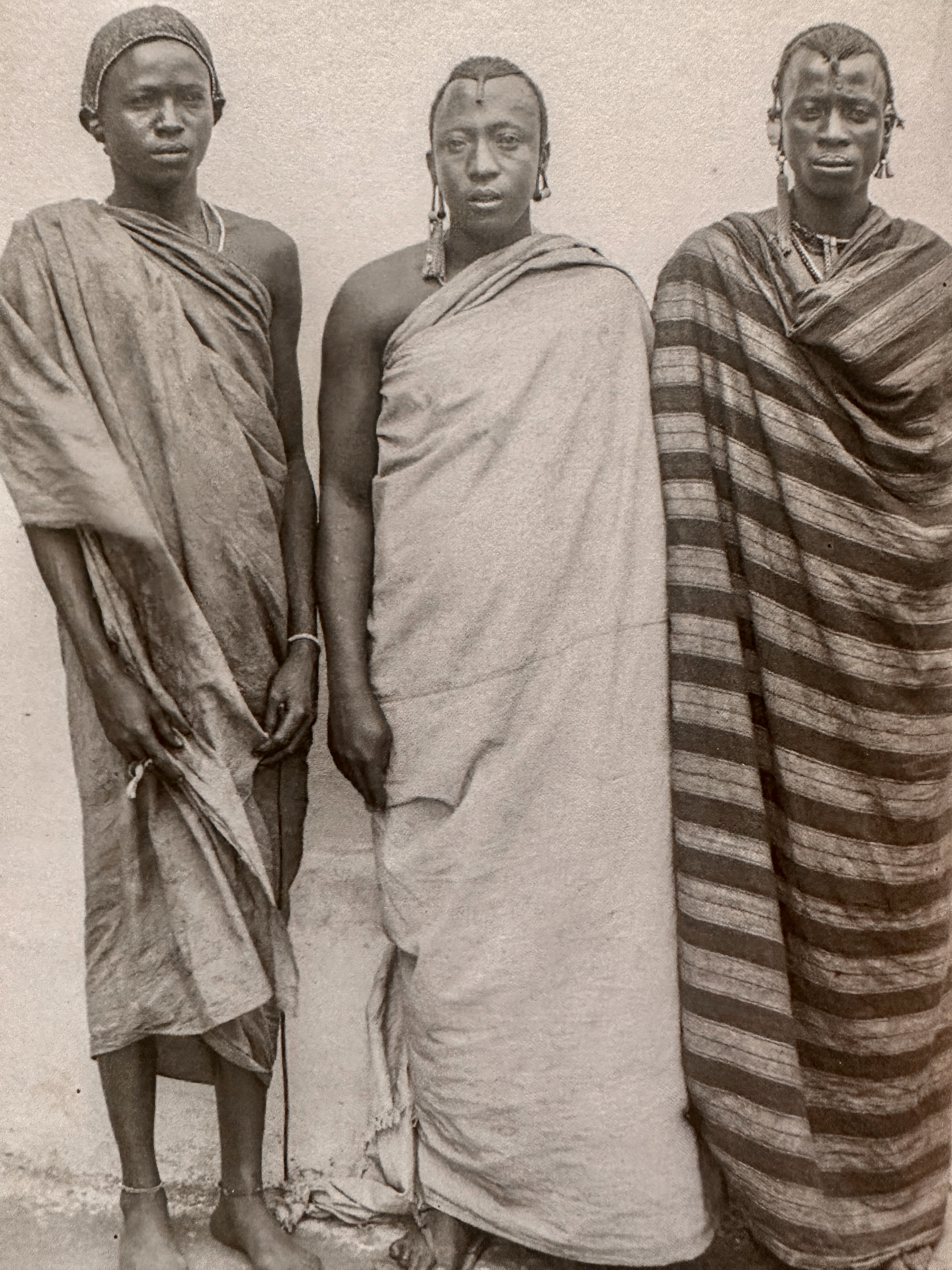
Mangi Meli and his Njama 1890s at the German Moshi Boma

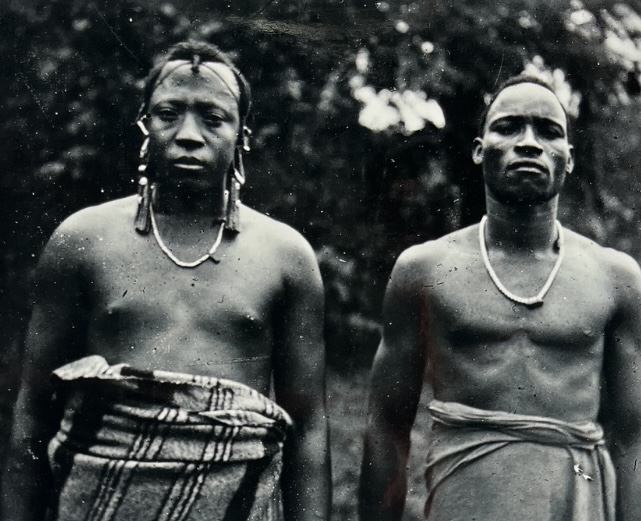
Meli and Kibanga 1890s

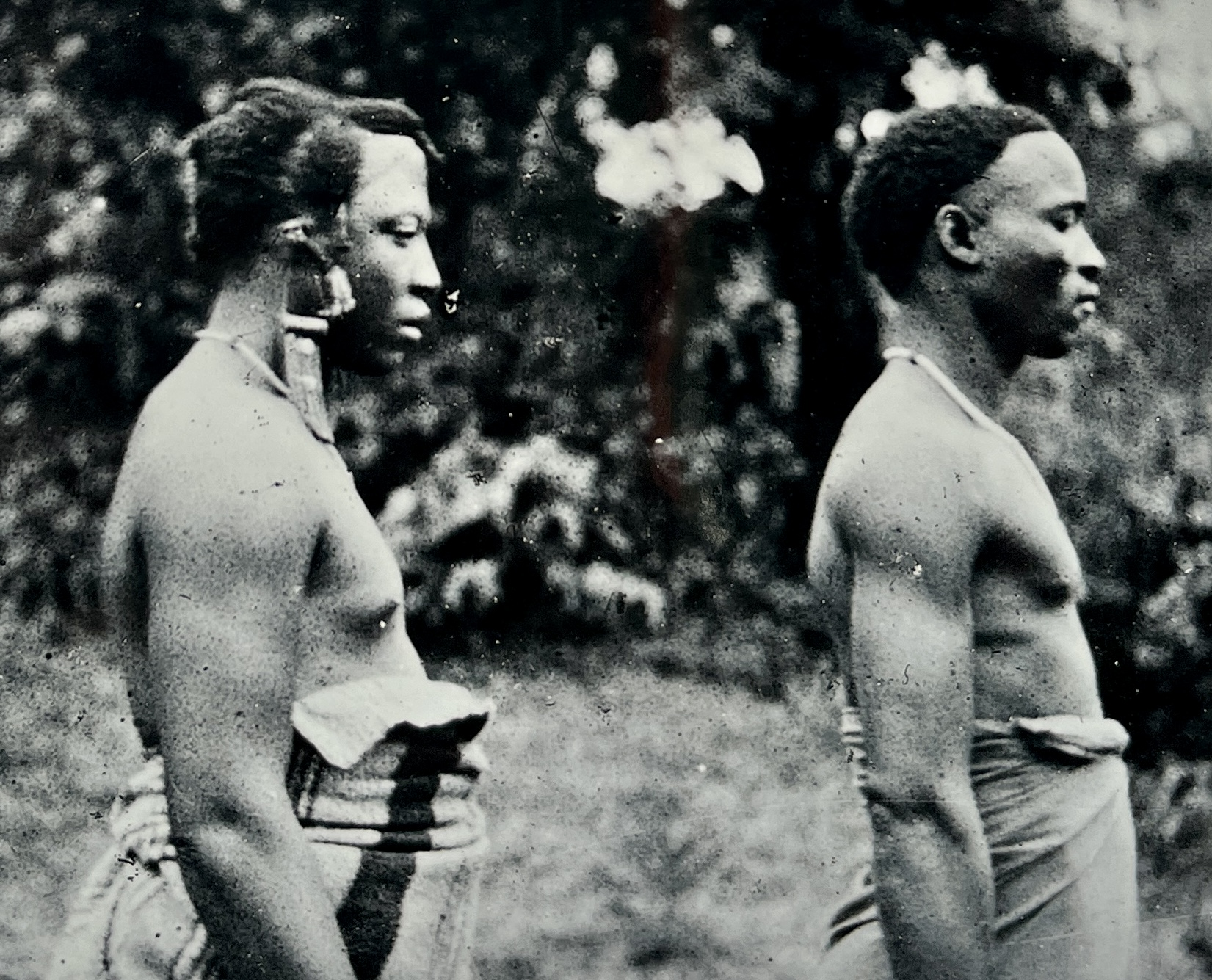
Mangi Meli and Kibanga, profile view

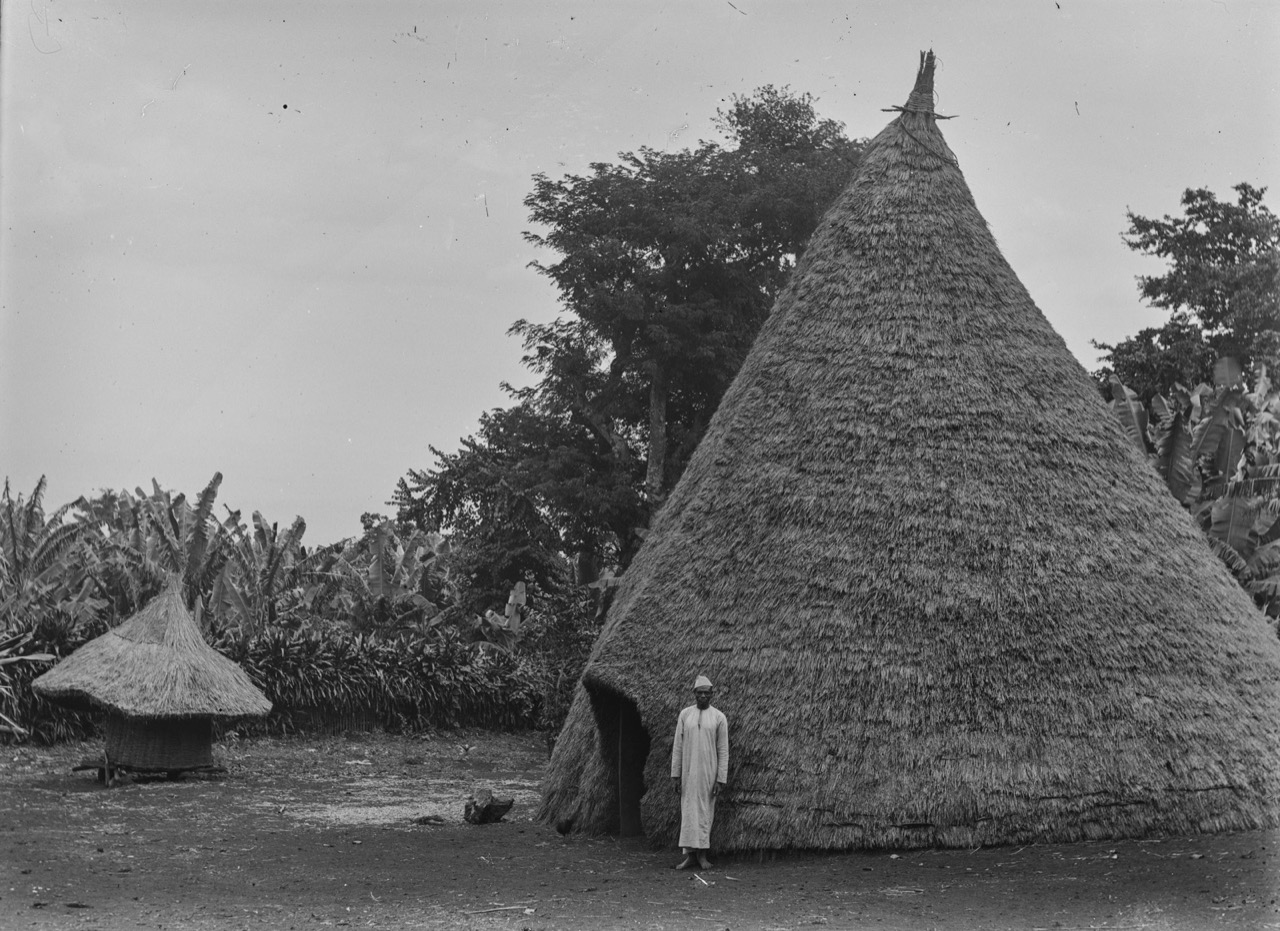
Meli's Chagga House

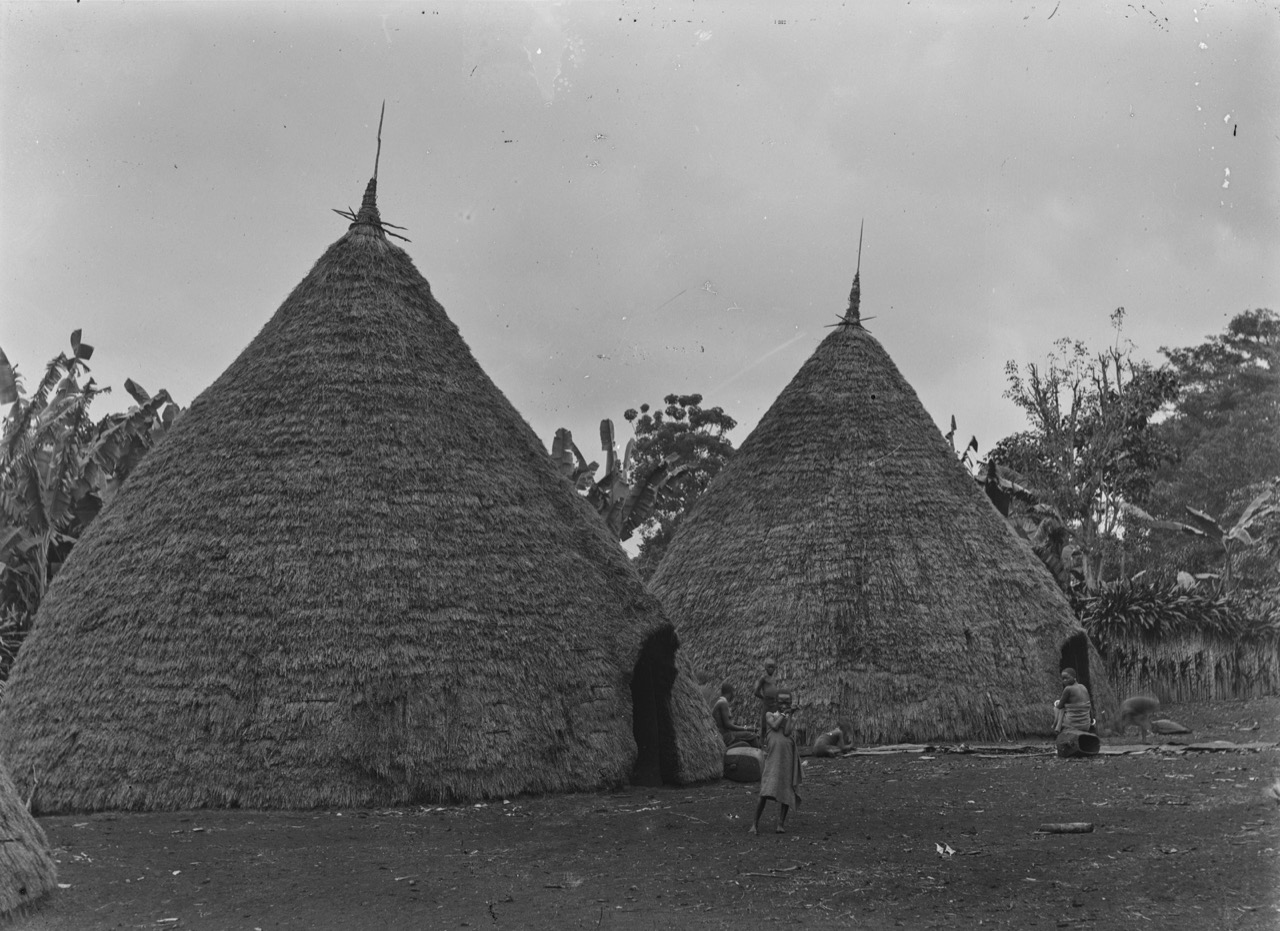
Meli's Boma

== War with Mangi Marealle ==
Meli was subjected to Mangi Marealle of Marangu's deft provocations and subsequent attempts to discredit him from the start of his reign. Marealle, the less well-known younger man, had previously regarded Mangi Rindi as old, venerable, and famous; however, with Meli's arrival, the age relation was reversed. Marealle was older than Meli and was still, despite his interactions with the Europeans, the insignificant ruler of an insignificant kingdom. Marealle had been a pain in Rindi's side, but he had responded to his ruses with deft countermoves conceived with all his mature diplomatic skill. Meli found such chess playing to be tedious. He exuded enthusiasm and confidence. He detested Marealle and his feeble realm and seemed to adore danger.

Marealle, meanwhile Because of the animosity he had created, they were motivated to subdue him because he had seen in February 1891 how well Mangi Sina had been alienated from the Europeans. Marealle was eager to duplicate the same feat against his second big enemy, Moshi, after witnessing the success with which his great opponent, Kibosho, had been defeated. Those two kingdoms were the obstacles to his growth. Marealle feared Meli more than he had feared Rindi, and if the German government hadn't already been set up, Meli would have destroyed Maralle in no time. Extremely valiant, Meli would have been considered a warrior king if the German presence hadn't stopped raiding save when it was carried out under the German regime's auspices.

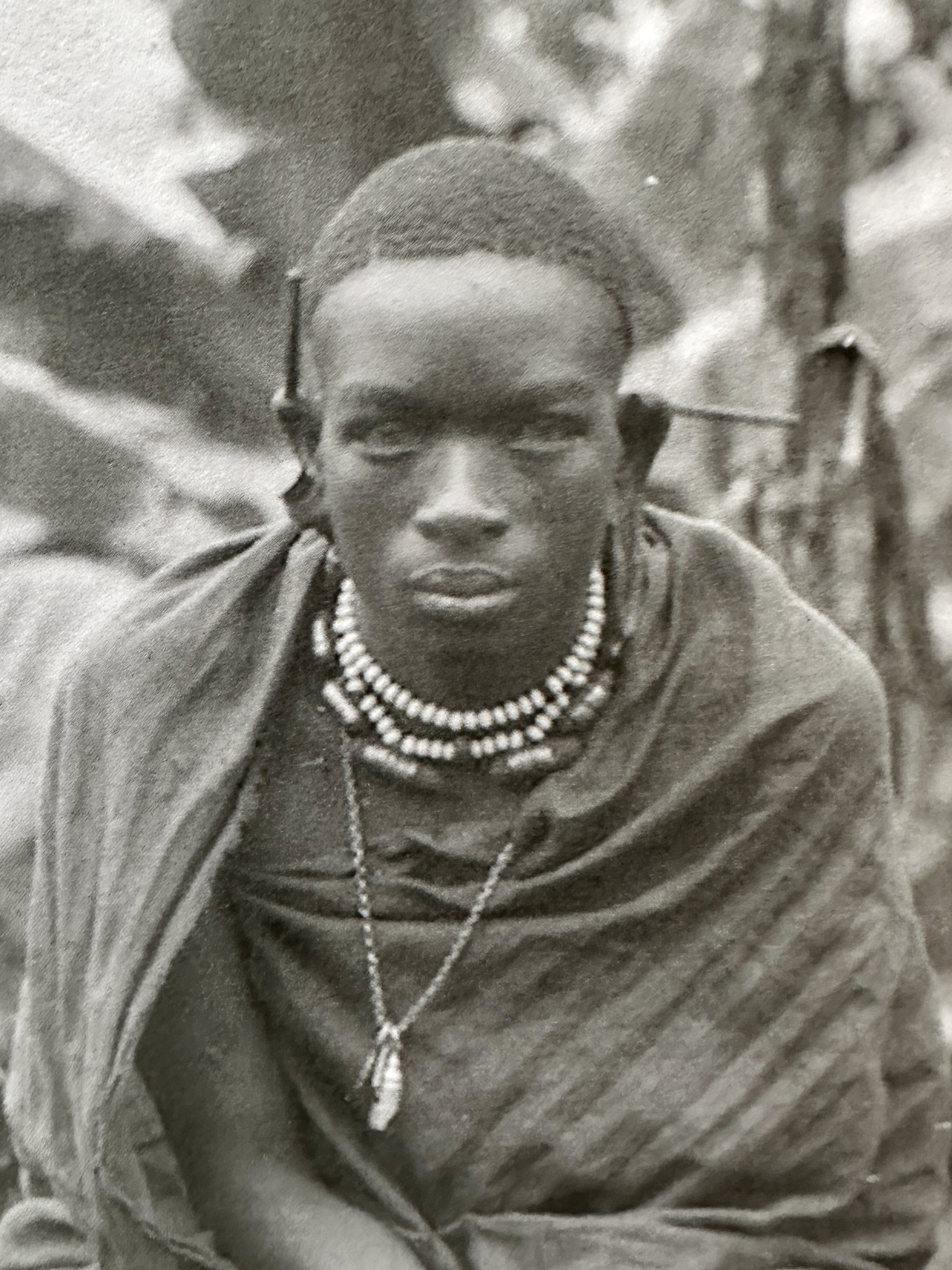
Mangi Marealle of Marangu c.1890s

It was more important than ever for Marealle to acquire the favor of the German officials and turn them against Moshi because of his fear of Meli. He benefited from the German government's choice to build a military and administrative outpost in his tiny realm. After defeating Kibosho in February 1891, according to official German accounts, Hermann Wissmann stayed behind to oversee the construction of a new German headquarters in Moshi, which replaced the thatched wooden building that had served as the station's headquarters since the station's founding in 1887. The following year, a new station at Marangu was built when the new station was abandoned.

Carl Peters made this location shift happen. Peters spent some time in Marangu after arriving in German East Africa in 1891 as an interim Reich Commissar before joining the commission that established the border between German and British East Africa in 1892–1893. Marangu served as the German headquarters from 1891 to 1893, first under Peters, then under Lt. von Bulow, and last under Capt. Kurt Johannes. Peters gave the station there the name "Kilimanjaro Station."

This development was significant for Marealle because it put him in the best possible position to persuade the Germans to side with Moshi. After all, they were already residing in his kingdom. This was a huge victory. In the views of the neighboring Kingdoms, who view the Germans' presence as a sign of his prestige, he was still an ineffective and unpopular monarch. Moreover, the Moshi and Kilema people openly poked fun at him for pandering to his European acquaintances, suggesting that they thought the Germans had made an odd decision. Karl Peters decided on Marangu for the station because he had dispatched an emissary to the Masinde shore to speak with the Germans and persuade them to switch their support from the purportedly treacherous Moshi to the purported ally Marangu.

Marealle and Peters got along incredibly well in Marangu. After Peters left, von Bulow displayed a new perspective: he disliked Marealle and supported Mawalla, who served as Marealle's right-hand man and agent to the Arabs and Europeans. Marealle continued nevertheless, and in a little more than a year following the German invasion of Kibosho, he was successful in fostering strife between von Bulow and Mangi Meli.

These events can be divided into three stages: first, Marealle separated the plot that separated the two; second, on June 10, 1892, von Bulow marched to Moshi to teach Meli a lesson but was ambushed, killed, and fled; third, Col. von Schele, the deputy governor of German East Africa, mounted a significant military expedition to avenge Bulow's subsequent action and shows it to have been less motivated than the German accounts, dismissing Bulow's subsequent action.

Traditional stories claim that he devised the Marealle strategy around a communication von Bulow in Marangu wanted to transmit to Moshi, which would eventually lead to the German military capture of Meli. He sent Mawalla and one of his troops to deliver the message. The soldier requested a woman carrying sweet potatoes for them as they crossed Kirua. Despite speaking Kichagga and Swahili simultaneously, they were unable to understand one another, and Mawalla did not try to explain the situation, even though he could do so Finally, the soldier took control of the potatoes and fled. He entered Moshi Kingdom while being pursued by a throng and was shot dead by Mawalla there. Mawalla, most likely, took the word of the shooting back to Marangu.

Von Bulow ascribed Moshi and Kirua responsibility for the demise of his messenger based on Mawalla's account of the events. The incident was essentially a pre-planned prank planned by Marealle and executed by Mawalla in the hopes that the Germans would send Moshi to hell by enforcing discipline and demonstrating their strength. Without telling Marealle what he was planning, Von Bulow called for a guide and porters to take him to Moshi via the plain to avoid the walk his messenger had to make via Kirua. One early morning, Askaris and another German officer, Lt. Wolfrum, departed from Marangu Station. Marealle was alerted to the fact that von Bulow was missing and frightened that he might be in Meli's hands. He kept visiting the station to find out where von Bulow had gone.

Von Bulow's party safely arrives in Moshi at this point. After setting up camp west of the Nanga, they ascend through Moshi between the Mola and Msangachi rivers with the aid of the guide. They were previously identified at the Nanga by Meli's scouts. The Germans intended to cross the river to Meli's boma after taking control of Rindi's old palace at Ufurunyi, which was located just to the east of the river. The Moshi warriors fire on the German party before they reach the Msangachi. Several askaris, Lt. Wolfrum, and Von Bulow perished. The remaining Askaris went back to Marangu in a panic, packing everything they owned and retreating to the coast while abandoning the Marangu station completely.

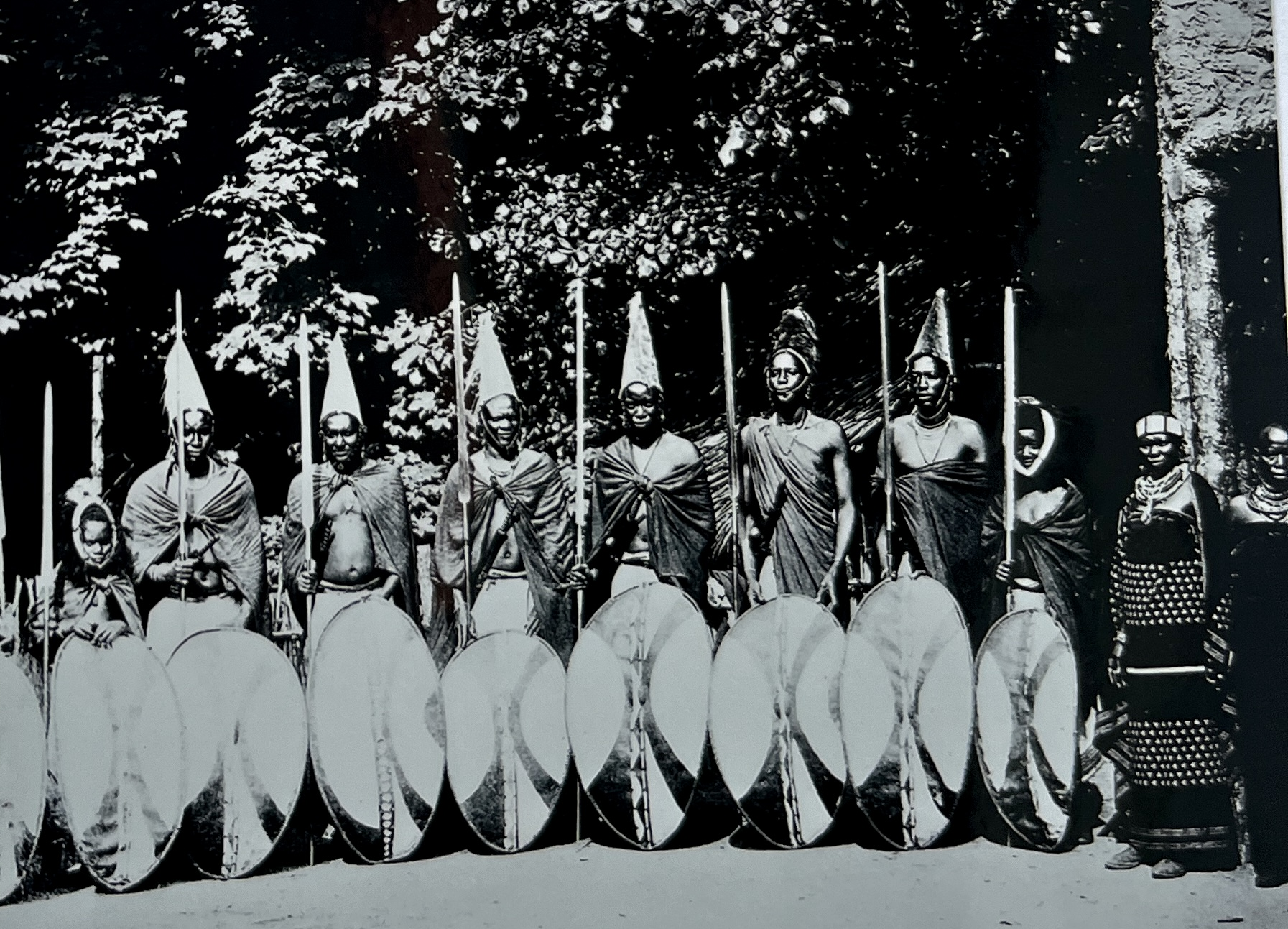
Meli's guard in the 1890s

Von Bulow undermined Marealle and was hasty to try and play off Marealle's right-hand man Mawalla against him because Marealle was far more intelligent than he was. Mawalla's benefit was minimized because he told Marealle that von Bulow had threatened to hang him and make Mawalla, himself, king in his place, a lie that allowed him to gain more favors from Marealle. Von Bulow made the terrible error of not telling Marealle that he intended to reprimand Moshi. He very well could have saved his life if he had done it. First, Fir Marealle gave him a mysterious guide and told the guide to take him by the most exposed path, as Fir Marealle subsequently recalled.

Von Bulow's death and the escape of his remaining askaris had the effect of ending German rule on Kilimanjaro for 51 days in 1892, from June 10 to July 31. The kingdoms briefly reclaimed their former sovereignty at this time. Meli was ecstatic with his victory over marealle rather than the Germans. His actions were motivated by a desire to disgrace Marealle with the Europeans, not by a wish to harm German soldiers. After the conflict, the Moshi people cut off the Marangu guide's ears, lips, and nose before releasing him and telling him to go tell Melyari (Marealle) that he, his people, and his children would suffer the same fate as they had done to them. The day after the Germans left, other people traveled to Kirema and, while seated at the bank of the river that separates Kilema from Marangu, mockingly yelled across: "Melyari (marealle), go see your father, the white man. Several herds of cattle have been transported by him from Moshi to the lowlands since yesterday”.

Marealle, meantime, was afraid. While he had previously been terrified, he was now in awe at the idea that Meli had defeated the all-powerful white guy despite his well-trained warriors and better military equipment. Due to his actions, not just Moshi but also the two intervening kingdoms of Kirua and Kilema, who had similar reasons to despise him, deserted the Marangu Station, leaving him at the mercy of his foes. He lived in constant fear of a Moshi attack that would destroy his country despite being completely aware of the provocation he had given to Meli.

He yet maintained his composure. Blanchard, an Alsatian Catholic missionary who had lately moved to Kilema to assist with admittance there and had briefly moved in with him in Marangu during the era of German rule's collapse, kept him going. Marealle was fortunate that Father August Gommenginger, Blachard's superior at the Kilema Mission, was away in Taveta because Marealle did not get along with Gommenginger. As a result, Blanchard's presence on Marealle's side was crucial during the interim period of 51 days.

Marealle dispatched agents to the shore delivering a message from Blanchard to the Governor asking for German troops to take back the position and put down Meli's resurgence. The question of what to do with the Germans' possessions left in the abandoned station arises. Marealle dispatched them to Mangi Kinabo, one of his allies in Mkuu. He told them that a new white man was firing his guns, credited with preventing Meli from attacking the kingdom. In 1959, Mangoto Hussein, also known by his alias Manfalili, one of the ambassadors who was almost a century old and regarded as the oldest man in Kilimanjaro at the time, presented an account of this expedition.

== The Battle of Moshi ==
Col. Friedrich von Schele, the deputy governor, led the Germans as they moved back to Kilimanjaro on July 31, 1892. Basing themselves in Marangu, they launched an effort to seize Moshi and put an end to what they called "the Chagga revolt" by doing so. Marealle provided the troops with supplies early on and this time gave them a reliable guide who knew the best route to take to Meli's boma for a surprise attack. But, he was too afraid of Meli's retaliation to let the Germans any soldiers to go with the troops and seize plunder, so the Germans mustered 800 Kibosho instead.

The invading force departed Marangu towards Moshi via the plain on August 11, 1892. This time, they followed the trail that led up the mountain west of Meli's boma and up Kidongonyi River, surprising the Moshi from behind. On August 12, around 6:15 am, the onslaught started. Three machine guns mounted on towering trees were fired toward Meli's crowded boma, which served as the kingdom's focal point. The Moshi warriors fired back with their guns and muzzleloaders. In their second assault, which began at 12:40, the Germans captured the Boma.

In contrast, to mangi Sina's, Meli's boma had not been turned into an impregnable fortress throughout the years. In large numbers, the warriors left the boma and retreated down the gully, where they scaled the height of the eastern side of the valley. The Germans then opened fire on them while keeping watch over them from the western bank, severely damaging them. The Germans then sent the Swahili, Funde, who had traveled with them over the river, to negotiate. Kiboko, a Moshi man who had previously served as chief ambassador to the coast and thus knew the protocol, subsequently raised the flag of surrender.

German records show that one German officer, four Askaris, and one German non-commissioned officer were all killed in action, while Moshi suffered 135 fatalities and more than 100 injuries. Col. von Schele gave the orders for the 800 Kibosho warriors to enter the abandoned dwellings, burn them on fire, and drive away any remaining cattle the following day, on August 13. One of the homes that were destroyed was Meli's, which contained the priceless presents that his father Rindi had given him. Among these gifts was a sewing machine supplied by the Kaiser that the German troops later used as a spit for roasting meat. In an ironic turn of events, the Kibosho helped the Germans conquer Moshi, just as the Moshi had done the same for Kibosho only 18 months before.

== After the Battle of Moshi ==
Meli emerged from his hiding place east of Masangachi after this final disaster, terrified and ashamed, to confess his complete submission. In exchange for peace, Mangi Marealle of Marangu was given control over Mali's eastern neighbours Kirua and Kilema, and Mangi Sina of Kibosho was given control over his western neighbour Uru. Both actions harmed Moshi, but the first gave Marangu a brand-new advantage, whilst the sound only gave Kibosho back an earlier influence that had been lost due to the German invasion in 1891.

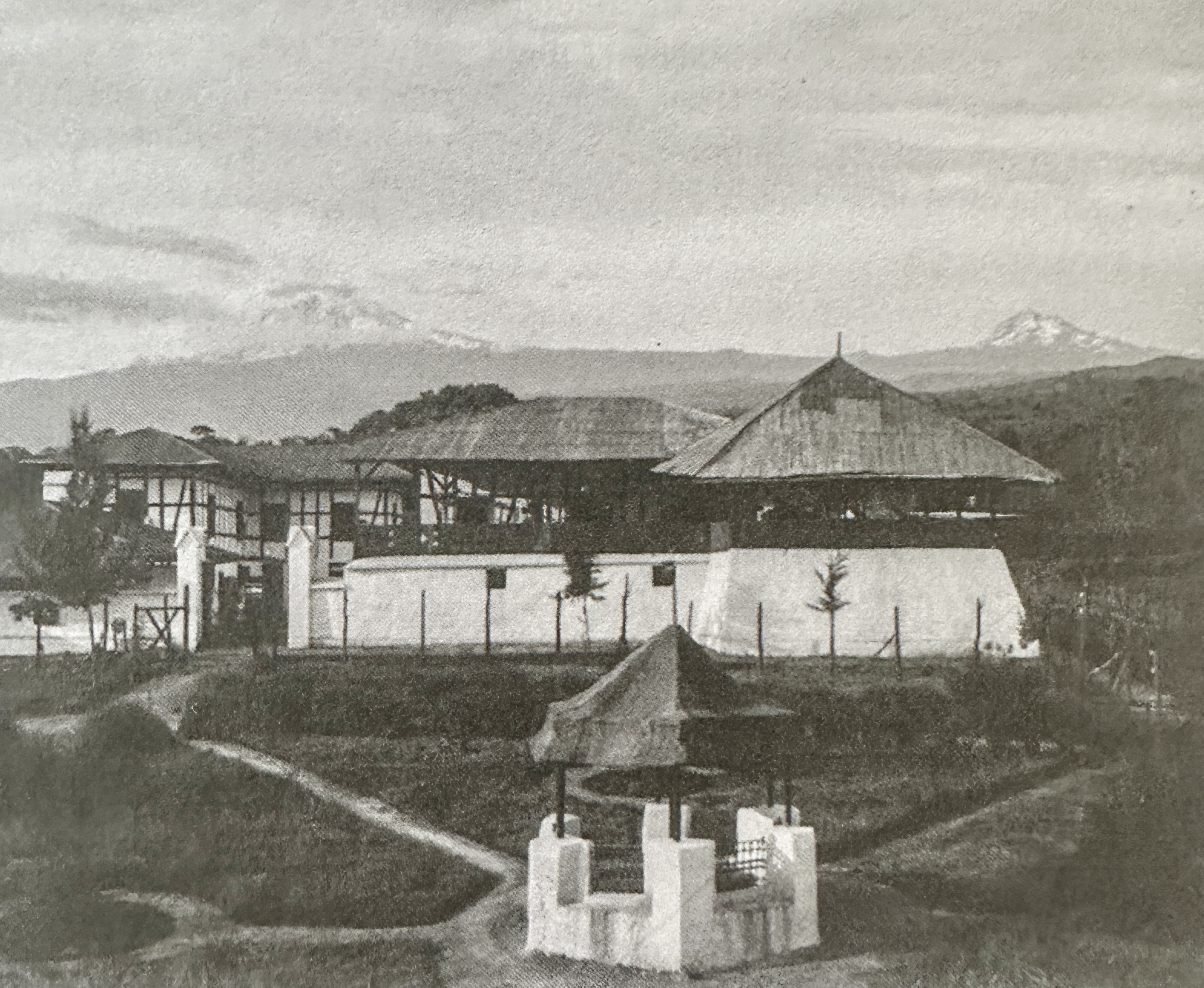
German Moshi Boma Built in 1893 on the former site of Mangi Meli's Boma

In addition, Meli had to pay a fine for cattle and provide the labor and materials for the Germans' decision to erect a sizable new headquarters in Moshi. Because of this, the German authorities insisted that the 1885-founded CMS missionaries in Moshi vacate the mountain. They were believed to be undermining the German position by sympathizing with and influencing Mangi Meli. The missionary's A.R. Steggall positioned himself behind him. The Protestantism on Kilimanjaro was turned over to the Lutheran mission in September 1892 with the removal of the English mission.

Marealle viewed the terms as a significant triumph. Now he was a man of means. His reputation with the German government was built by accounts of his actions during the 51 days before the Germans resumed control of Kilimanjaro, particularly his safekeeping of German possessions from the deserted Marangu station. He had succeeded in destroying the reputations of the Kilema and Kirua kingdoms and his great enemy Moshi in their eyes, and they accepted, without doubt, his version of the events that had led to the "Chagga insurrection."

Hence, Marealle must be considered to have won the German expedition against Meli in 1892. Moshi had been the most influential of the three kingdoms that suffered because of the influence Mangi Rindi left behind. Kilema had a proud history in the distant past, and Kirua was the least important. The defeat crushed Mangi Fumba of Kilema's spirit, and he asked to leave the Germans and go back to his forefathers' house out of their sight on the plains because he could not stand to see Marangu men traveling virtually every day through his property in Kilema on their route to Moshi.

Although Meli's situation was challenging in many ways, he was more resilient. Col. von Schele names Capt. Johannes was commandant of the new Moshi station following the battle, a position that was completed right away using the stone that had previously made up the 2-meter-high walls surrounding the bomas of Meli and Rindi. Early in 1893, Johannes relocated his headquarters into the new structures, downgrading the Marangu post to a sub-station. When Johannes first climbed Mount Kilimanjaro, he was a soldier in the German army fighting to defeat Kibosho in 1891 and Moshi in 1892. The alliance between Johannes and his favorite, Marealle, controlled Kilimanjaro's operations for the duration of his whole tenure as commandant, from 1892 to 1901.

To keep Meli's homestead under observation, Johannes deployed his askaris there. Oral stories claim that Meli stoned them at night in revenge. He adjusted to the circumstances. As the 1890s went on, the Germans started to believe that out of the 40 kings of Kilimanjaro, Marealle of Marangu, Meli of Moshi, and Mangi Sina of Kibosho were the most dependable and trustworthy. Marealle was chosen first from the group due to her kindness, and the three were also chosen to get the dress attire of senior German officers, which included plumed helmets and gold-braided coats, which they wore on the Kaiser's birthday.

== Execution ==
Marealle continued to view Moshi and Kibosho, still-powerful kingdoms, as the two biggest challenges to his ambitions despite having attained power and position and being supported by the Germans. He plotted to bring them down in one audacious move, along with several smaller fry in less powerful Kingdoms, by persuading Captain Johannes that they were all complicit in a plot to topple the German government.

The beginning of 1900 marked the culmination of the scheme. When Johannes called all Chagga leaders and levies of their men to join him in a vengeful expedition against the Arusha in February 1900, he had already made up his mind to hang the alleged traitors. Furthermore, the alleged traitors themselves were already aware of his plans since Mangi Shangali, Marealle's ally from Machame, revealed the plot to certain influential people in Moshi, who then revealed it to Meli. The fact that Meli and the other accused didn't quickly flee north out of German East Africa to Nairobi may have been due to the same men acting as double agents.

Oral traditions state that preparations for Meli's exodus were undertaken, and Merinyo, the war chief of Meli, was selected to lead the way. When the threatened kings were first denied their fair share of the German loot—the cattle of the Arusha—and then granted it, Meli and his friends may have argued that this revealed the plot to be fiction. This decision to abandon the idea of flight may have been made as a result of the dissemination of counterinformation and tangible facts.

As soon as he arrived back in Kilimanjaro, Johannes called the alleged mangis and their top men to Moshi Boma. They were hanged there after being tried there the day before. The Chagga were terrified by this act throughout Kilimanjaro, but Moshi was particularly horrified because its residents had to watch it. After all, they were nearby. They were old men, still alive in 1959. And they recall that despite attending, several people were unable to comprehend what was happening. Thomas, a member of the Moshi Tenga clan, had been hired to serve as an interpreter from Swahili, but Marealle had already murdered him.

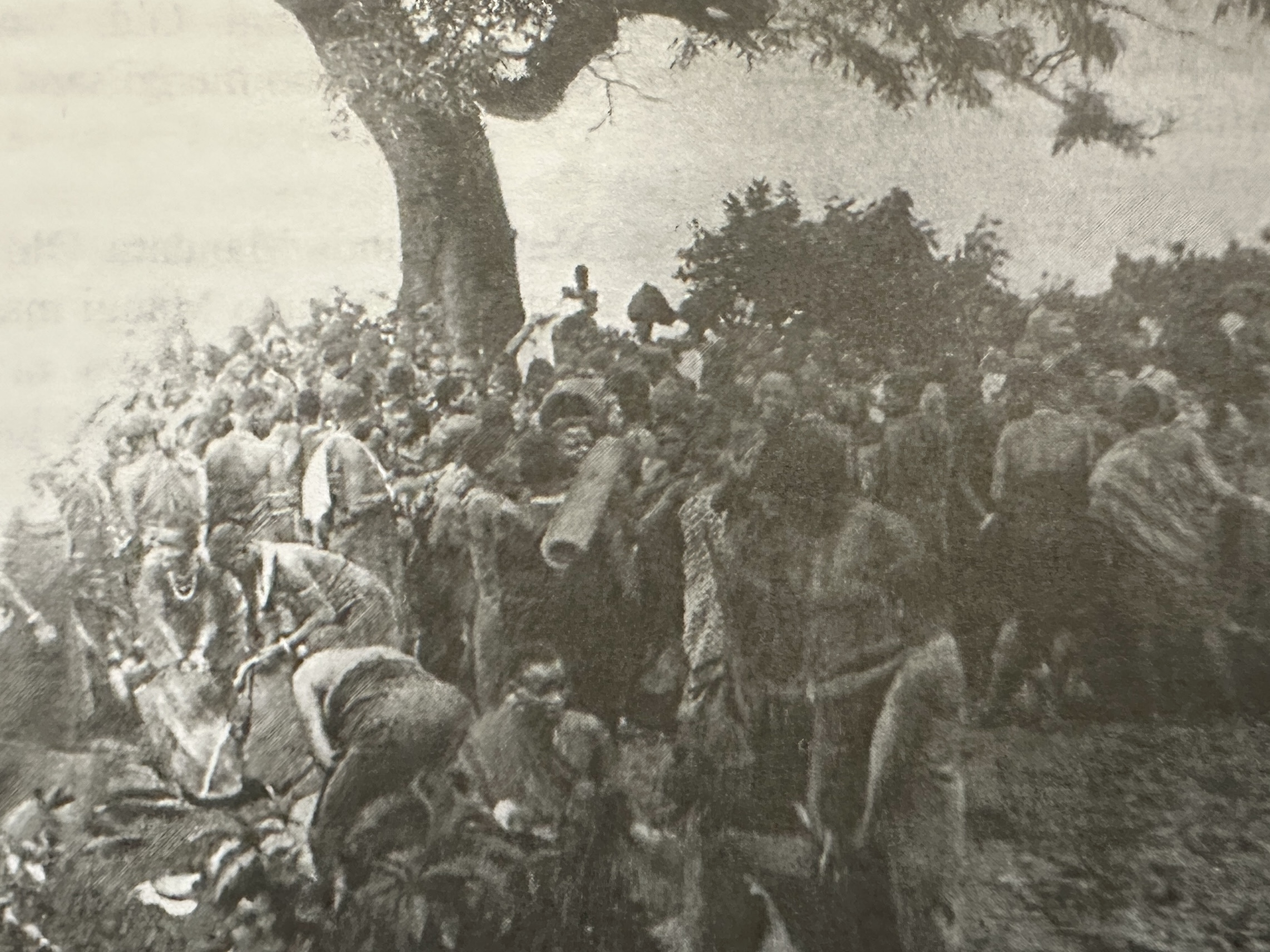
Market place in Tsudunyi, Old Moshi 1890s. The execution tree in the background

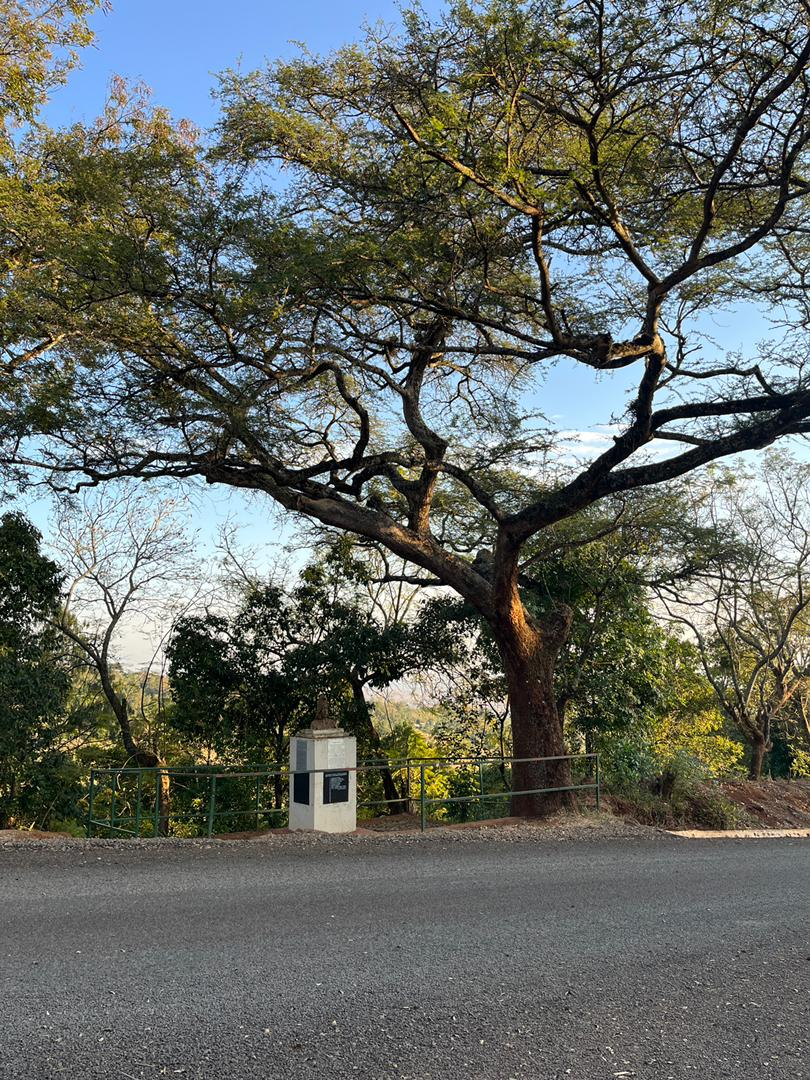
Execution tree in Moshi where the Mangi Meli and 19 other rulers and noblemen were hanged in 1900

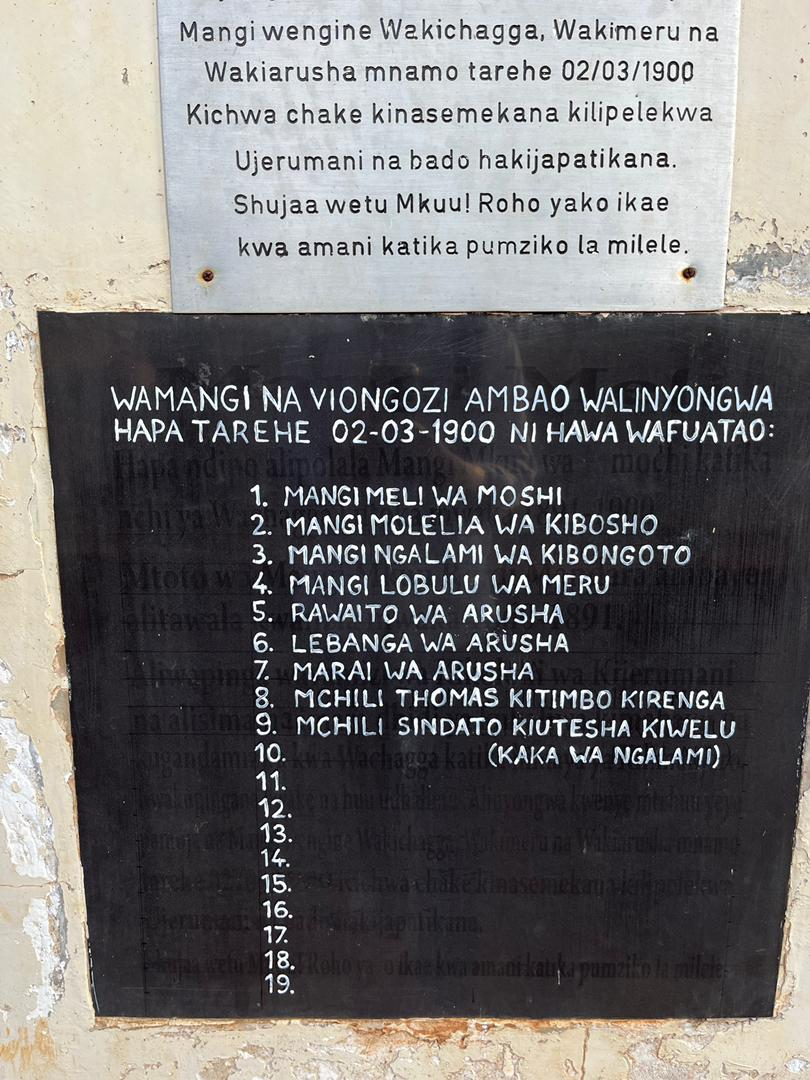
Plate with names of the fallen leaders of Kilimanjaro, Arusha, and Meru

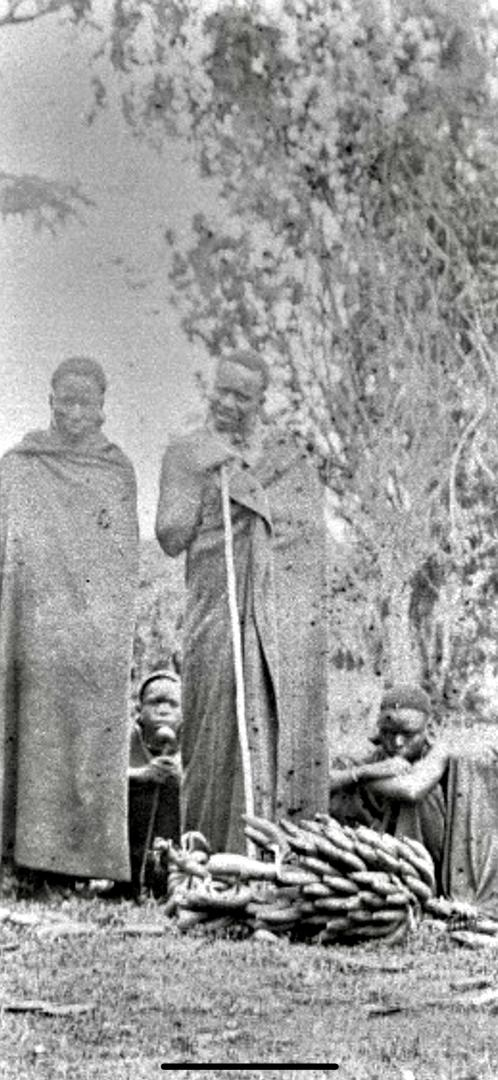
Mangi Ngalami c.1890s, was also murdered on the same day with Mangi Meli

The accused men were hanged in front of the Boma from a tree that is still there, next to the river Msangachi ravine. They awaited their time one by one to climb the tree in front of everyone in Moshi and some other kingdoms. Those who saw it described it as the worst sight they had ever seen on the mountain. Eyewitnesses Moshi and Kibosho made a point of mentioning that Mangi Meli died bravely while reliving the incident in 1959, a very uncommon instance of the Chagga using this term to describe the deed of any individual.

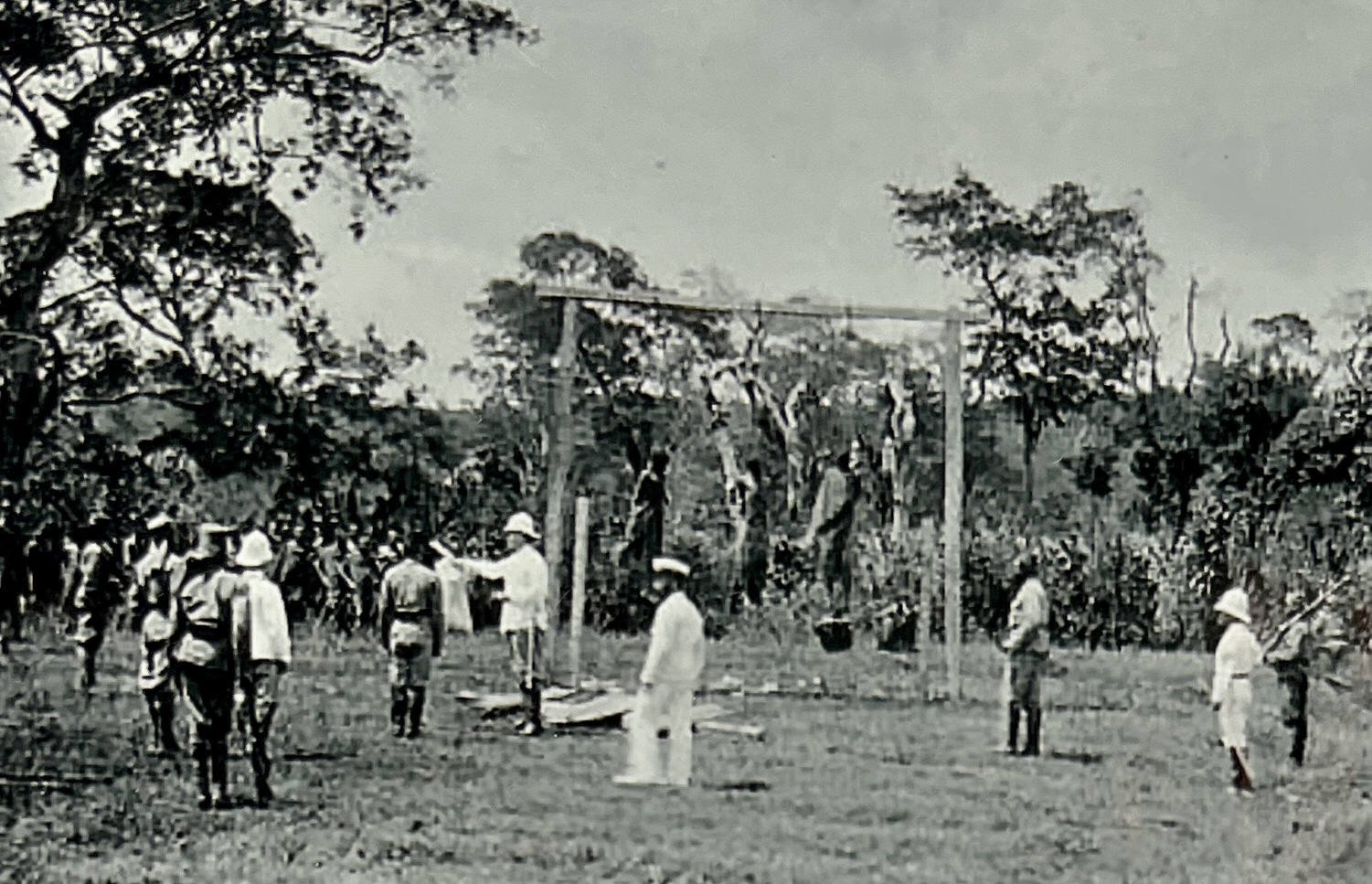
German colonial government hangings of Chagga men in Kilimanjaro 1890s-1900

Meli sang a song before ascending the tree that he had written after learning of the Arusha battle's plot, a song that had already been sung by residents of Moshi after the conflict ended:

The time has come to let
The calf go to its mother
The time has come
For the great man
Oh, for the great one
To return once more.

Then, by himself, he climbed the tree. He spent a long time hanging with his head in the noose. Up until the Askaris shot him, he was still alive. An elderly man who recalls that there was wailing throughout Moshi provides the finest description of the impact of this incident on Moshi. Why should we keep our cattle when our Mangi is dead, people said as they slaughtered all of their livestock. For a year, no one planted anything. For two years, one person planted eleusine. Everyone chooses not to attend class. When the white guy killed their king, they cried out, "What will he do to our children?" The entire Moshi Njama (noblemen) dispersed. Some departed the nation. Others relocated to the periphery. They moved out of fear of suffering the same fate as Meli.

== After Meli's death ==
The community was tranquil after Meli's execution. They have given up trying to accomplish anything. The Germans and the Missions were the ones who finally made them start working again. It is regarded as the most depressing event in Chagga's past. It is applauded how Meli died. Dr. Bruno Gutmann's arrival in 1902 to begin his extensive service to the Lutheran mission left Moshi feeling disheartened. By praising the illustrious exploits of their great old mangi Rindi, he assisted in restoring their pride. When Askaris would beat the Moshi people, Gutmann would step in and assured the officials at the Boma that the people were peaceful. This is how Gutmann is remembered.

For Moshi, the 20th century got off to a disastrous start, but for the following 22 years, the chiefdom was in good hands. Immediately following the execution, Capt. Johannes requested that Mangi Marealle, who was widely believed to be the mastermind of the plot at Moshi, travel to Moshi and proclaim Meli's brother Salema as the new king. Salema was in power from 1900 to 1917. He had been king because of the first significant Chagga conspiracy that affected all of Kilimanjaro, and he was deposed because of the second. Mangi Salema was one of the kings banished to Kismayu in 1917 after being falsely accused of trying to topple the incoming British government.

Less than four different people held the mangiship during the following five years. The son of Rindi's brother Kitori, Mkinde, was first appointed by the British government. Second, Salem was reinstated and ruled for a brief period before dying after the conspiracy was shown to be untrue and the deportees returned. Finally, the mangiship briefly transferred to Meli's family in the form of his son Sudi.

In remembering, it is believed that Sudi had no parallel in terms of build, intelligence, or activity; but, as soon as he was named mangi har, he turned dim and began to hide anytime a European passed by. Fear of a rival faction that was determined to depose him in favor of his cousin, Salem's son Abraham, guided Sudi's actions. The son of Rindi's former war chief, Joseph Merinyo, supported Abraham and was well-positioned to push his cause because he worked as the Boma's clerk and interpreter. People in Moshi were now being deliberately told rumors that Meli's problems were caused by the dying curse of his deceased sibling Krirta. No mention of a fatal curse had ever been made until Kirirta died in 1891, but the creation of such a curse now made Sudi dread for his life.

At the Boma, Merinyo presented Major Dundas, a serving British official at the time, with the problem using an educational justification that served his political agenda. Due to their parent's refusal to let them go following Meli's hanging, men of Sudi's age had not attended school. Abraham, on the other hand, had gone to a mission school when he was younger. Major Dundas was informed by Meriyo that he was the only person capable of ruling. Once Sudi was overthrown in 1922, Abraham was appointed Mangi in front of Major Dundas and Merinyo. Throughout at least 24 years, from 1922 to 1946, Mangi Abrahm reigned effectively. His leadership helped his kingdom rise once more and regain its position as one of Kilimanjaro's leading countries.

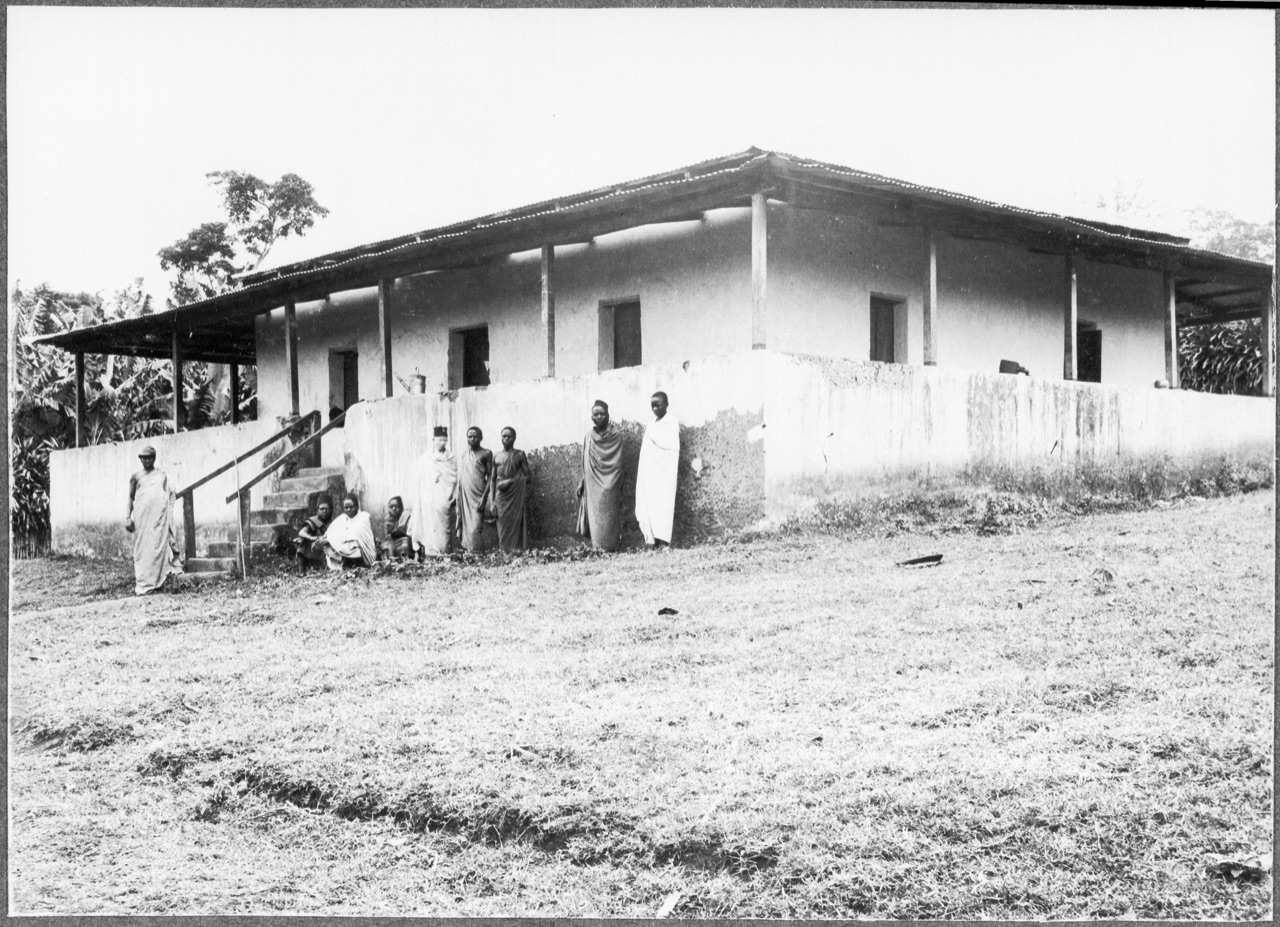
Salema Meli stone house

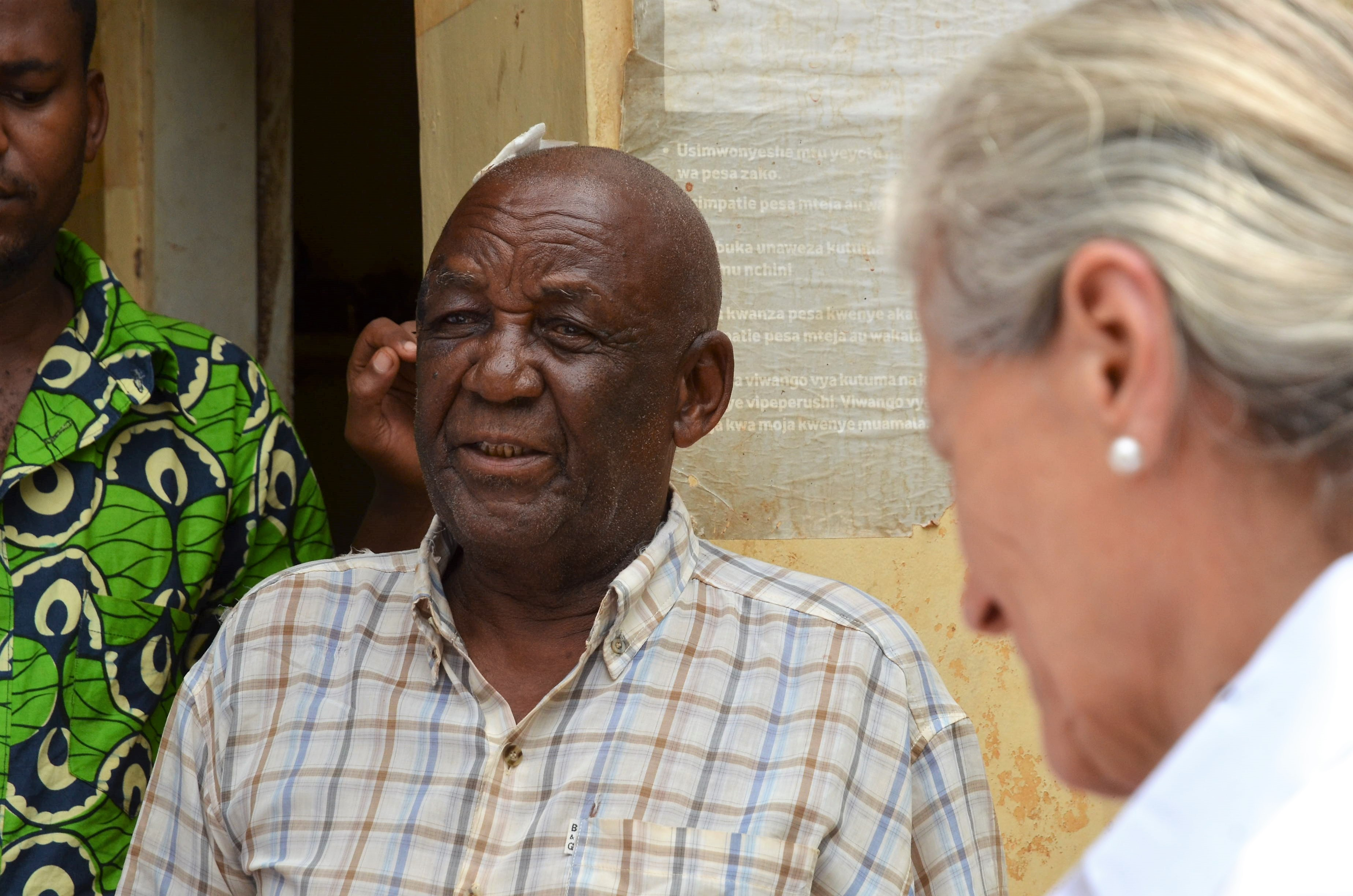
Isaria Meli, Grandson of Mangi Meli in 2014

== Legacy ==
Meli is hailed one of the heroes of the former Tanganyika colony, having been prominent in the fight against colonial encroachment on the slopes of Mount Kilimanjaro. After his capture, Meli was convicted of rebellion and was hanged at a public execution as his people watched. Following his death, the German colonial administration ordered his head to be removed and it is believed to have been sent to Berlin by Felix von Luschan to be used in phrenological studies. It was then apparently stored in a museum. Efforts are currently being made to try to recover his remains and return it for proper burial in Tanzania. Lt. Col. Moritz Merker, who was second in command at the military outpost in Moshi at the time of Mangi Meli's execution, sent the six skulls to Germany for testing, according to activist Konradin Kunze, who spoke to the BBC. Yet, he said, Merker never noted a skull in his old records as belonged to the Mangi. Isaria Meli expects to live long enough to see the skull recovered and returned, but he is prepared for the possibility that there won't be a match.

== See also ==
- Mangi Rengua
- Mangi Ngalami
- Chagga states
