= Marangu =

Human settlement in Tanzania

Coordinates: 3°21′17″S 37°31′19″E

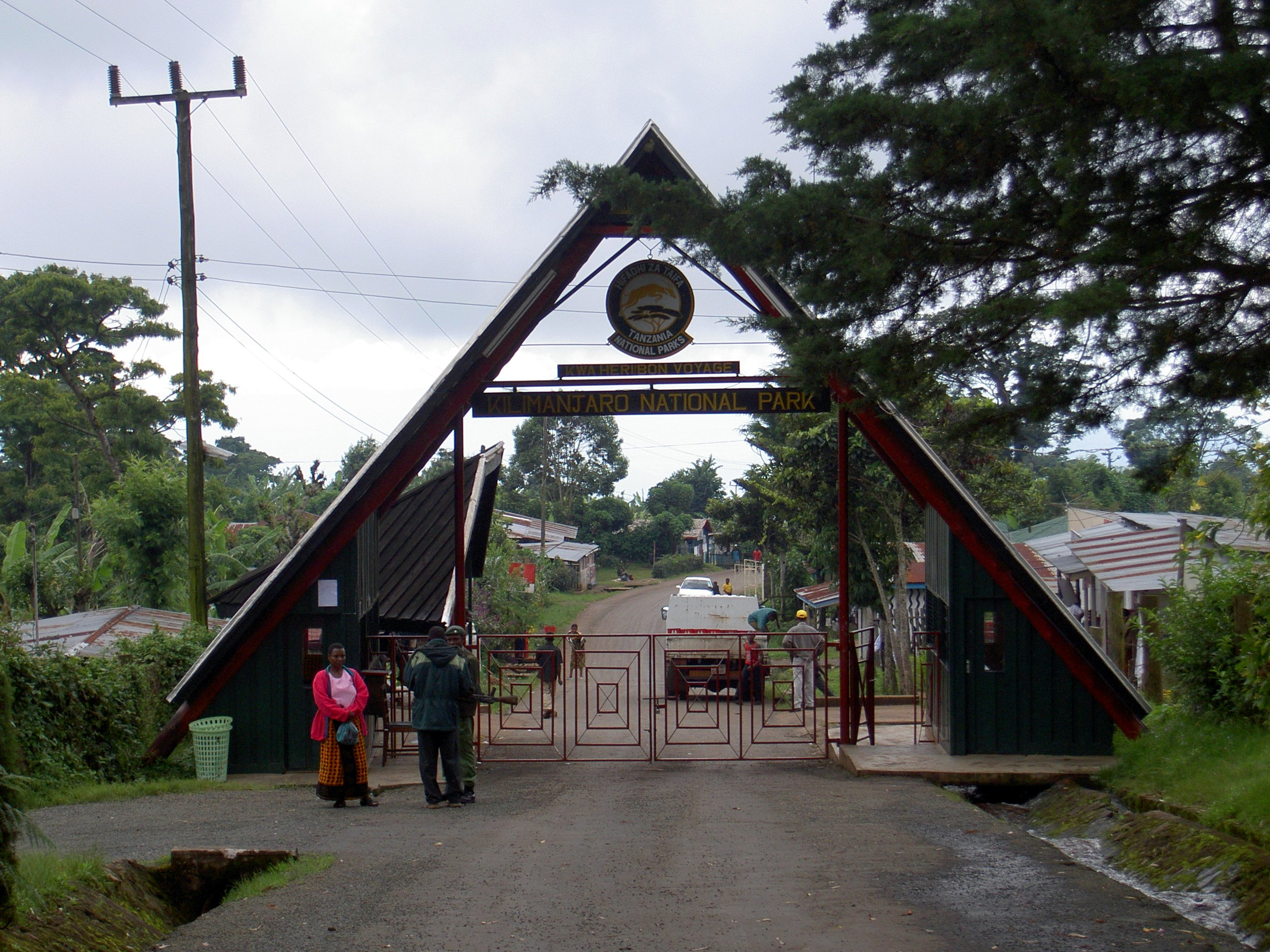
The Marangu Gate entrance to Kilimanjaro National park.

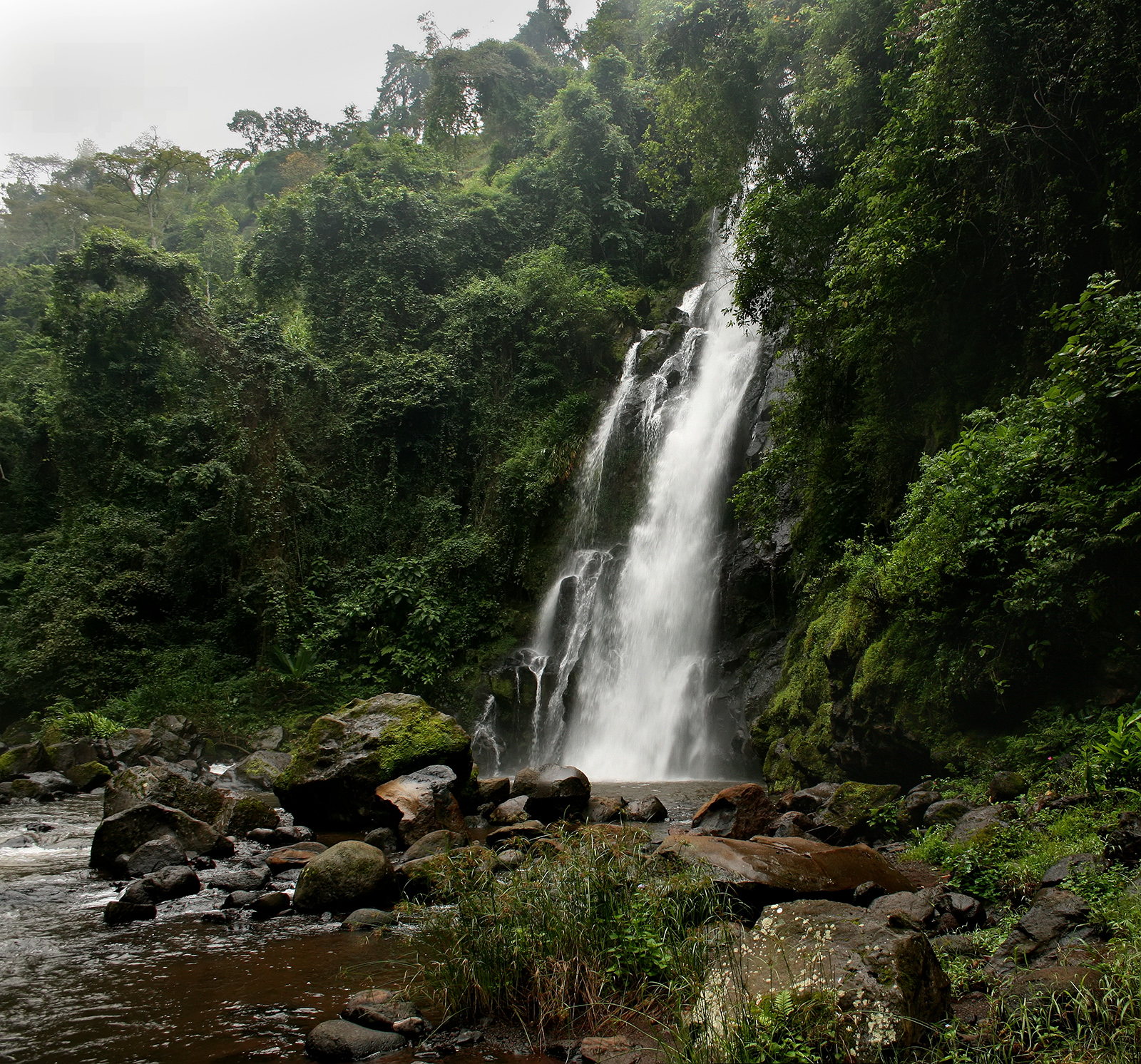
The Marangu Waterfalls.

Marangu is a town in the Moshi District of the Kilimanjaro Region, divided into Marangu East and Marangu West, each comprising its own village. It is one of the main access points for climbing Mount Kilimanjaro and is also known as the birthplace of the Chagga paramount chief Thomas Lenana Marreale, born on 15 June 1915.

== History ==
Before Independence in 1961, Marangu served as the headquarters of the Vunjo district, led by Chief (Mangi Mwitori) Petro Itosi Marealle and Paramount Chief (Mangi Mkuu) Thomas Marealle, installed in 1951 and based in Moshi. The four-and-a-half-day Marangu Route is considered the least demanding ascent of Kilimanjaro. Kinyala Johannes Lauwo (1871–1996) of Ashira Marangu is regarded as the first person to have climbed Kibo Peak, and was reported to have died at the age of 125 in 1996.

== Etymology ==
The word Marangu means "a place with many water streams." It is among the well-known localities in Tanzania. A Chagga proverb, Ulamine kilahu ulyemkiwoa (not from the Vunjo dialect), means "do not despise someone or something from which you once received support." The town is located about 119 km from Arusha and 39 km from Moshi.

== Economy ==
Many Marangu residents are farmers, cultivating bananas, vegetables, and coffee, though tourism is the main source of income. The Marangu route is one of Africa's most popular hiking routes. The town has several hotels, such as Babylon Lodge and Kilimanjaro Mountain Resort, which host visitors climbing Mount Kilimanjaro. Marangu also attracts young people from across Tanzania seeking work in tourism as porters and guides.

== Education ==
Marangu is home to The Marangu Teacher Training College and Ashira Girls High School and many other schools which provides education to not only Marangu residents but to other residents from different places around Tanzania.

== See also ==
- Tanzania
- Chaga
- Kilimanjaro Region
- Kilimanjaro National Park
