= Mochi language =

Bantu language

Mochi
- Moshi
- Kimochi
- Native to: Tanzania
- Ethnicity: Chaga people
- Native speakers: (597,000 cited 2000)
- Language family: Niger–Congo?: Atlantic–Congo; Volta-Congo; Benue–Congo; Bantoid; Bantu; Northeast Bantu; Chaga–Taita; Chaga; Central Kilimanjaro; Mochi

Language codes
- ISO 639-3: old
- Glottolog: moch1256 Mochi
- Guthrie code: E622A

Mochi is a Bantu language spoken in Tanzania. It is the prestige language of the Chaga people.

== Phonology ==
=== Consonants ===
Mochi is one of the few languages in the world to have a linguolabial consonant, though only in a few 'expressive' words, such as [t̼o] for 'surprise or relief.'

== See also ==
- Bantu languages
- Langues of Tanzania

== Bibliography ==
- Mrikaria, George (2008). Kimochi: msamiati wa Kimochi-Kiswahili-Kiingereza [Mochi-English-Swahili lexicon]. Lexicon series (in Mochi, Swahili, and English). Dar-es-Salaam: Languages of Tanzania LOT Project, University of Dar es Salaam. pp. iv+89. ISBN 978-9987-691-17-3.
