= Rosemary Nyerere =

Tanzanian politician & academic (1961–2021)

- Born: 27 October 1961
- Died: 1 January 2021 (aged 59); Dar es Salaam, Tanzania
- Education: Mzumbe University; The Institute of Finance Management; Strathclyde University
- Known for: Accountancy; politics; social welfare
- Political party: Chama Cha Mapinduzi
- Spouse: David Mwamakula
- Children: 5
- Parents: Julius Nyerere (father); Maria Nyerere (mother)

Member of Parliament (Tanzania)
- In office 2000–2005

Rosemary Nyerere (27 October 1961 – 1 January 2021) was a Tanzanian politician and academic. She was a daughter of the late Mwalimu Julius Nyerere, the founder and first president of the United Republic of Tanzania.

== Background and family ==
Nyerere was born on 27 October 1961 and is among the eight children of the late Mwalimu Julius Nyerere and Mama Maria Nyerere.

She married David Mwamakula on 21 May 1994 in Butiama. The couple had five children and three grandchildren.

On 1 January 2021, she Nyerere suddenly just after ringing into the New Year celebrations for the year 2021, in addition to celebrating her mother's birthday. On 6 January (Epiphany), in the Immaculate Chapel parish church located in the Upanga neighbourhood of Dar es Salaam, a farewell requiem mass was held for her. She was later laid to her final resting place in the Pugu burial ground and her funeral service was attended by Prime Minister Kassim Majaliwa and then-Vice President Samia Suluhu who represented then-President John Magufuli in acting as main guests of honour in paying their last respects to her, both during her wakes from 2 to 5 January and on the funeral day.

== Education ==
Nyerere had her primary level education from 1967 to 1973, at Forodhani and later Bunge primary school. From 1974 to 1977 she finished her lower secondary level education from Weruweru Secondary School, and from 1977 to 1979, she attended Korogwe High School for her upper secondary education. From 1987 to 1989, she attended Mzumbe University (just after taking foundation studies in accountancy and finance for an extended period of eight years from 1979 to 1987 at The Institute of Finance Management at Dar es Salaam), studying an advanced diploma in certified accountancy, as she earned first class and received recognition awards, later to graduate and become a part-time lecturer at her alma mater. In 1999, she continued her studies overseas in Britain, particularly at Strathclyde University, Glasgow, Scotland, to pursue her master's degree in Investment and Finance.

== Career ==
From 1991 to 1999, Nyerere was a part-time lecturer at The Institute of Finance Management (IFM). From 1990 to 1993, she worked as an accountant in a local press and newsprint company known as The Central Tanganyika Press Ltd. based in Dodoma. She also served in several board positions (corporate/non-governmental) such as deputy board chairperson of Tambaza High School from 2010 to 2013. From 2002 to 2008, she was the board director of Tanzania Investment Bank. From 2002 to 2005, she served as a board member of the Ngorongoro Conservation Area. From 2000 to 2005, she was an MP for the Chama Cha Mapinduzi party's women special reserved seats quota.
