= Thomas Marealle =

Tanzanian chief (1916–2007)

Chief Thomas Marealle II OBE
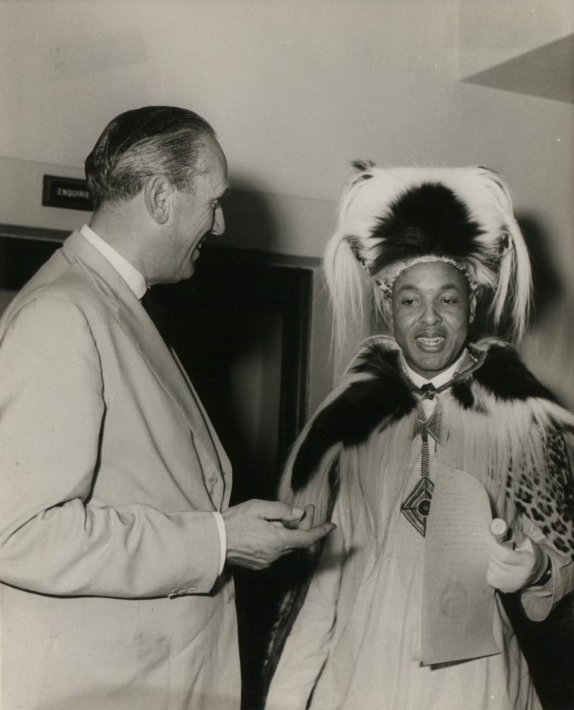
- Born: 15 June 1915; Marangu, German East Africa (now Tanzania)
- Died: 14 February 2007 (aged 91)
- Citizenship: Tanzanian
- Education: London School of Economics; Trinity College
- Occupation: Paramount Chief of the Chaga
- Predecessor: Petro Itosi Marealle
- Spouse: Elifuraha Marealle
- Children: Aggrey Marealle; Temi Marealle; Taddei Marealle
- Relatives: Dr. Wilfred Marealle (brother)

Chief Thomas Lenana Marealle II OBE (June 15, 1915 – February 14, 2007) was the Paramount Chief (Mangi Mkuu) of the Chagga people of Tanzania and a politician.

After winning a paramount chieftainship election, which he ran against Abdi Shangali of Hai, Jackson Kitali of Moshi, Petro Marealle of Vunjo and John Maluma of Rombo, Chief Mareale was inaugurated as chief in January 1952. Thomas Marealle ruled alongside Chief Mangi Mwitori. Petro Itosi Marealle consolidated power from the other 3 Chagga chieftains thus making the Chagga more powerful and in control of their affairs during colonial times. The government abolished the system of chieftainships in 1961, although Marealle, anticipating this, had voluntarily left his post the previous year. His tenure as Mangi Mkuu was regarded as a golden age, marked by major improvements in education, health, the cooperative movement, and communications in his area. In particular his court system and his equitable water allocation system are recalled with great nostalgia.

After working for the United Nations in the field of foreign aid for thirteen years, he retired as a diplomat. He died on 14 February 2007 at the age of 92, and buried at his homeplace in Marangu, Moshi.
