= Aggrey =

Aggrey is both a surname and a given name. The term means powerful and complete. Notable people with the name include:

== Surname ==
- James Aggrey (1875–1927), Ghanaian missionary and teacher
- Jimmy Aggrey (born 1978), English football player
- Orison Rudolph Aggrey (1926–2016), American diplomat

== Given name ==
- Aggrey Awori (1939–2021), Ugandan politician
- Aggrey Bagiire, Ugandan politician
- Aggrey Burke (1943–2025), British psychiatrist and academic, born in Jamaica
- Aggrey Chiyangi (born 1964), Zambian football player
- Aggrey Jaden (1920s–1980s), South Sudanese politician
- Aggrey Klaaste (1940–2004), South African journalist
- Aggrey Morris (born 1984), Tanzanian footballer
- Aggrey Mwanri (born 1955), Tanzanian politician and deputy minister

== See also ==
- Aggrey beads, Ghanaian bead handicraft
- Aggrey House, a hostel in London
- Aggrey Road, a street in Port Harcourt, Nigeria
