= Moshi language =

Moshi may refer to:

- Old Moshi language, the prestige variety of the Chaga languages of Tanzania
- Mossi language, the national language of Burkina Faso
