= Weruweru Secondary School =

- Shule ya Sekondari Weruweru (Swahili)

Location
- Kilimanjaro; Moshi, Hai District; Tanzania; 3°18′41″S 37°16′4″E

Information
- School type: Public, secondary school
- Established: 1963; 63 years ago
- Founder: Sister's of Assumption of God
- School number: S0221
- Headmistress: Rosalia Frimin Tarimo
- Teaching staff: 53
- Gender: All girls
- Sixth form students: 570
- Education system: Tanzanian
- Language: English
- Campus type: Rural
- Colours: Blue, red, green, Yellow, Purple
- Song: Weruweru Yetu
- Sports: Netball, Basketball, Football, Badminton, Volleyball
- Website: www.weruwerugirls.sc.tz

Weruweru Girls Secondary School (formerly known as Assumpta College) is a government secondary school in Moshi, Tanzania.

== History ==
The school was established in September 1963 as Assumpta College and was officially inaugurated by Julius Nyerere, Tanganyika's first president on 22 October 1963. In 1970, the school was renamed to its present name after it was handed over to the government.

== Headmistresses ==
- Maria Kamm (1970–1992)
- Flaviana Msuya (1993–2001)
- Anna Devota Sambaya (2001–2009)
- Rosalia Frimin Tarimo (2009–Present)

== Notable alumni ==
- Asha-Rose Migiro, former Deputy Secretary-General of the United Nations
- Mary Nagu, Tanzanian politician
- Anne Malecela, Member of Parliament for Same East constituency
- Mwele Ntuli Malecela, former Director General of the National Institute for Medical Research (NIMR) in Tanzania, former Director in the Office of Africa Regional Director at the World Health Organisation, Director Department of Control of Neglected Tropical Diseases at World Health Organization headquarters (till death 10 February 2022).
- Irene Tarimo, Researcher, Biologist and Lecturer at OUT
- Rosemary Nyerere, Educator, Member of Parliament
- Helen Kijo-Bisimba, Former Director of Legal and Human Rights Center
- Julie Makani, Associate Professor and Research Fellow at MUHAS
