= Wunjo =

Wunjo may refer to:

- *wunjō, a rune of the Germanic alphabet
- Vunjo language, a Bantu language spoken in Tanzania
