= Augustino Mrema =

Tanzanian politician (1944–2021)

Honourable Augustino Mrema MP

Member of Parliament
- In office November 2010 – November 2015
- Preceded by: Aloyce Kimaro
- Succeeded by: James Mbatia
- Constituency: Vunjo
- In office 1985–1995
- Constituency: Moshi Rural

11th Minister of Home Affairs
- In office 1990–1995
- President: Ali Hassan Mwinyi
- Preceded by: Nalaila Kiula
- Succeeded by: Ernest Nyanda

Chairperson of Tanzania Labour Party
- In office 1998 – 21 August 2022
- Preceded by: Post established
- Succeeded by: Hamad Mkadam Rajab

Chairperson of NCCR-MAGEUZI
- In office 1995–1999
- Succeeded by: James Mbatia

Deputy Prime Minister of Tanzania
- In office 1992–1994
- President: Ali Hassan Mwinyi
- Preceded by: Salim Ahmed Salim
- Succeeded by: Doto Biteko

Personal details
- Born: Augustino Lyatonga Mrema; 31 December 1944 Tanganyika
- Died: 21 August 2022 (aged 77) Dar es Salaam, Tanzania
- Party: Tanzania Labour Party (1999–2022); NCCR–Mageuzi (1995–99); CCM (1966–1995)
- Education: Singachini Teachers Training College; Mwalimu Nyerere Memorial Academy; Pacific Western University

Augustino Lyatonga Mrema (31 December 1944 – 21 August 2022) was a Tanzanian politician, who served as minister of home affairs from 1990 to 1995.

After switching party affiliation in February 1995, he joined NCCR-Mageuzi before moving on to Tanzania Labour Party (TLP), where he was made the party chairman. He also served as the member of parliament for Vunjo constituency, on multiple occasions, until 2015, when he was defeated in the national election by James Mbatia of NCCR Mageuzi. In early 2016, Mrema was appointed a chairperson of the Tanzania Parole Board by the president, John Magufuli.

Mrema was of Chagga heritage from Kiraracha village, on the slopes of Mount Kilimanjaro. He was the second of five siblings.

== Education ==
From 1955 until 1963, Mrema attended primary and secondary education at Moshi, thereafter joining St.Patrick Teachers training college also in Moshi where he finished his Secondary education in 1965. In 1968, Mrema sat for the Cambridge University O-level exams. He joined the Kivukoni Political Education College, after which he was sent to Marangu for further training.

== Government positions ==
Mrema has been in the Tanzanian government, National Security Organisation and in Chama Cha Mapinduzi (CCM) since 1966; he has held the following 5 positions as follows:

- Rural Civics Teacher 1974–1980
- Teacher at the National Security College 1980–1982
- Assistant Deputy for National Security in the Dodoma Region 1982–1984
- Chief Deputy for National Security in Dodoma Region 1983–1984
- Chief Deputy for National Security in Shinyanga Region 1985–1987

== Political career ==
Even though Mrema has contested every presidential election in Tanzania since the country instituted a multiparty system in the early 1990s, his political career started in 1985 when he tried to run for MP in his home district of Kilimanjaro. His candidacy was blocked by the High Court, and in 1987 he was officially announced as the winner after a lengthy appeals process. He was able to retain his seat in 1990 without stiff competition. The fact that he was an MP enabled the president to appoint him to various cabinet positions. From 1990 to 1995, Mrema held various cabinet and high level government positions:

- Minister of Interior 1990–1994
- Minister of Labour, Development and Sports 1994–1995

Mrema left CCM in 1995 and joined a new political party National Convention for Construction and Reform-Mageuzi. In the first multiparty election in 1995, he ran on the ticket of the National Convention for Construction and Reform-Mageuzi (NCCR-Mageuzi), and won 27.77% of the vote. He finished third behind the then-incumbent president, Benjamin Mkapa, of Chama Cha Mapinduzi (CCM) and Ibrahim Lipumba of the Civic United Front (CUF), capturing 7.80% of the vote, this time on the ticket of the TLP. Running again as the TLP presidential candidate in the 2005 election, Mrema was fourth out of ten candidates, winning 0.75% of the vote. By this time he got presidential appointment as parole board chairperson from 2016 to 2019.

== Death ==
Mrema died in Muhimbili Hospital Dar es Salaam on 21 August 2022 06:15 am, at the age of 77.
