= Jumbe =

Jumbe may refer to:

== People ==
- Aboud Jumbe (Aboud Jumbe Mwinyi, 1920–2016), president of Zanzibar from 1972 to 1984
- Friday Jumbe (born 1955), Malawian economist and politician
- Jumbe Rajab Jumbe (1940–2005), Tanzanian Chadema politician
- Salum Jumbe (born 1997), Tanzanian cricketer
- Jumbes of Nkhotakota, a dynasty of Swahili Arabs slave and ivory traders established in Malawi

== Other uses ==
- Aerodyne Jumbe, a French paraglider design
