= Rusa language =

Bantu language spoken in Tanzania

Rusa
- Arusha-Chini
- Native to: Tanzania
- Region: Kilimanjaro Region
- Extinct: (date missing)
- Language family: Niger–Congo?: Atlantic–Congo; Benue–Congo; Bantoid; Bantu; Northeast Bantu; Chaga–Taita; Chaga; Rusa

Language codes
- ISO 639-3: None (mis)
- Glottolog: arus1242
- Guthrie code: E.63

The Rusa (Rusha) language, also known as Arusha-Chini, is one of the Bantu languages of Tanzania spoken by the Chaga people. It is spoken in the Chaga area of the Kilimanjaro region, and forms a dialect continuum with other Chaga languages.
