= Anna Aloys Henga =

Tanzanian lawyer and activist

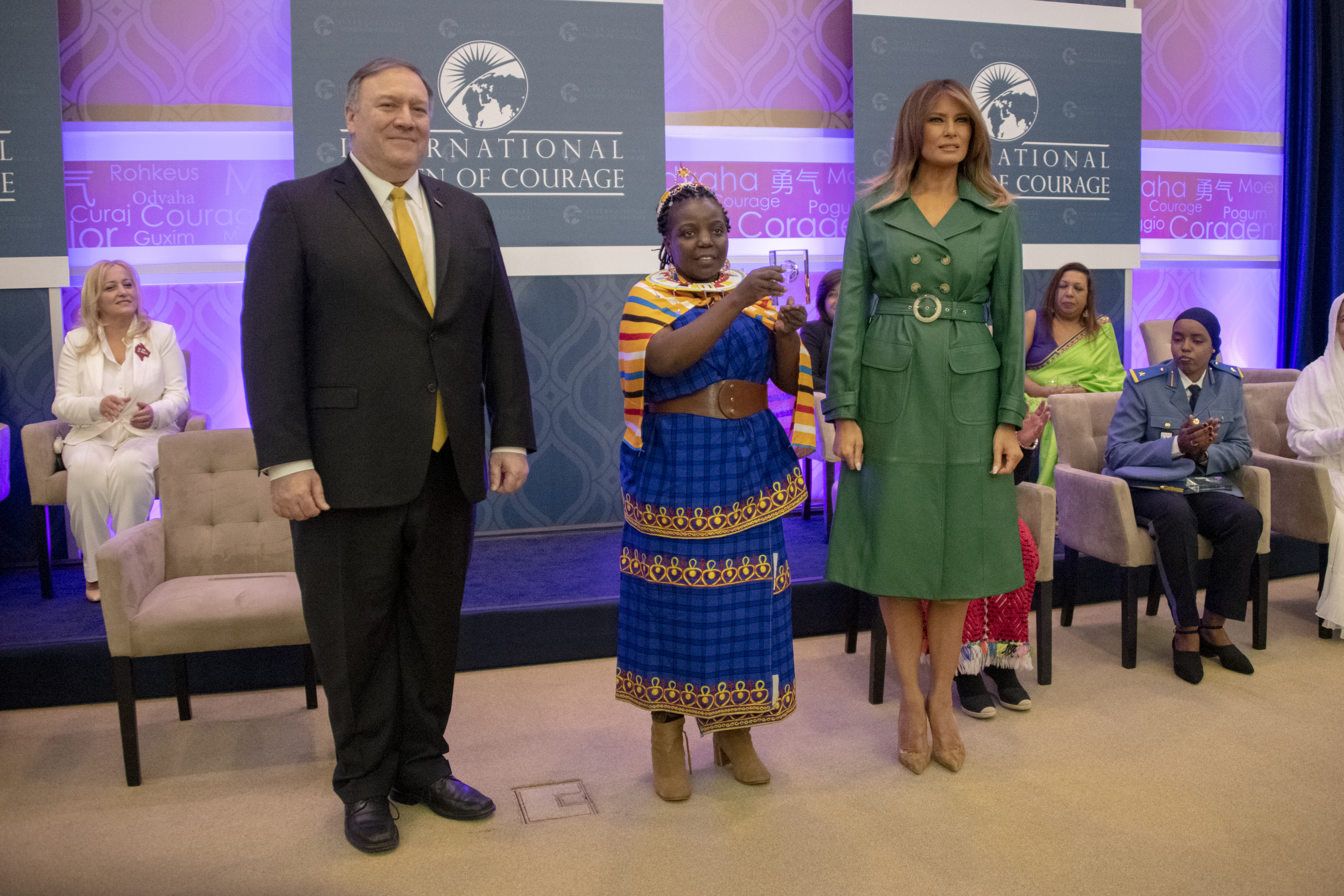
- Anna Aloys Henga poses with a IWOC award alongside US First Lady Melania Trump
- Occupations: diplomat, lawyer, Human Rights activist
- Predecessor: Helen Kijo-Bisimba
- Awards: 2019 International Women of Courage Award

Anna Aloys Henga is a Tanzanian lawyer and human rights activist who is known for her social services including women empowerment initiatives such as coordinating anti-female genital mutilation in Tanzania. She became the executive director of Legal and Human Rights Center in 2018.

== Life ==
Henga's parents were civil servants and she was one of their six children. She said that she was unaware as a child of sexual discrimination.

She campaigns to reduce Female genital mutilation. It has been illegal in Tanzania since 1998 but it is estimated that 10% of girls still suffer this treatment.

In 2015, she mobilized other Civil Societies in Tanzania to successfully observe the Tanzanian general elections. She is also known for motivating other women to involve in politics in Tanzania.

She is also a human rights activist and was appointed as the executive director of Legal and Human Rights Center (LHRC) in 2018 replacing Dr. Helen Kijo-Bisimba.

Her major areas of expertise are Human Rights Law, Policy analysis, Gender and Practice for Non-Governmental Organizations and Theology.

Anna holds a master’s degree in Development Policy and Practice for Civil Society, (Mzumbe University, Tanzania), Post Graduate Diploma in Business Administration - Institute of Finance Management (IFM Tanzania), Bachelor of Laws (University of Dar es Salaam, Tanzania), Diploma in Gender- from Sweden Institute of Public Administration and Diploma in Theology from Mahanaim School of Theology, Certificate of Directorship from the Institute of Directors (IoDT) and Certificate of Corporate Governance from ESAMI.

The organization she leads (LHRC) documents Human Rights situation in Tanzania through a Tanzania Human Rights Report produced annually and biannually. The organization is also well known for Election Observation, Civic Education and Democratic Processes.

In 2019, she was named as one of the recipients of the International Women of Courage Award and received the prestigious award from the United States Department of State. Notably, she, Moumina Houssein Darar (Djibouti) and Maggie Gobran (Egypt) were the three African women who were included this year.

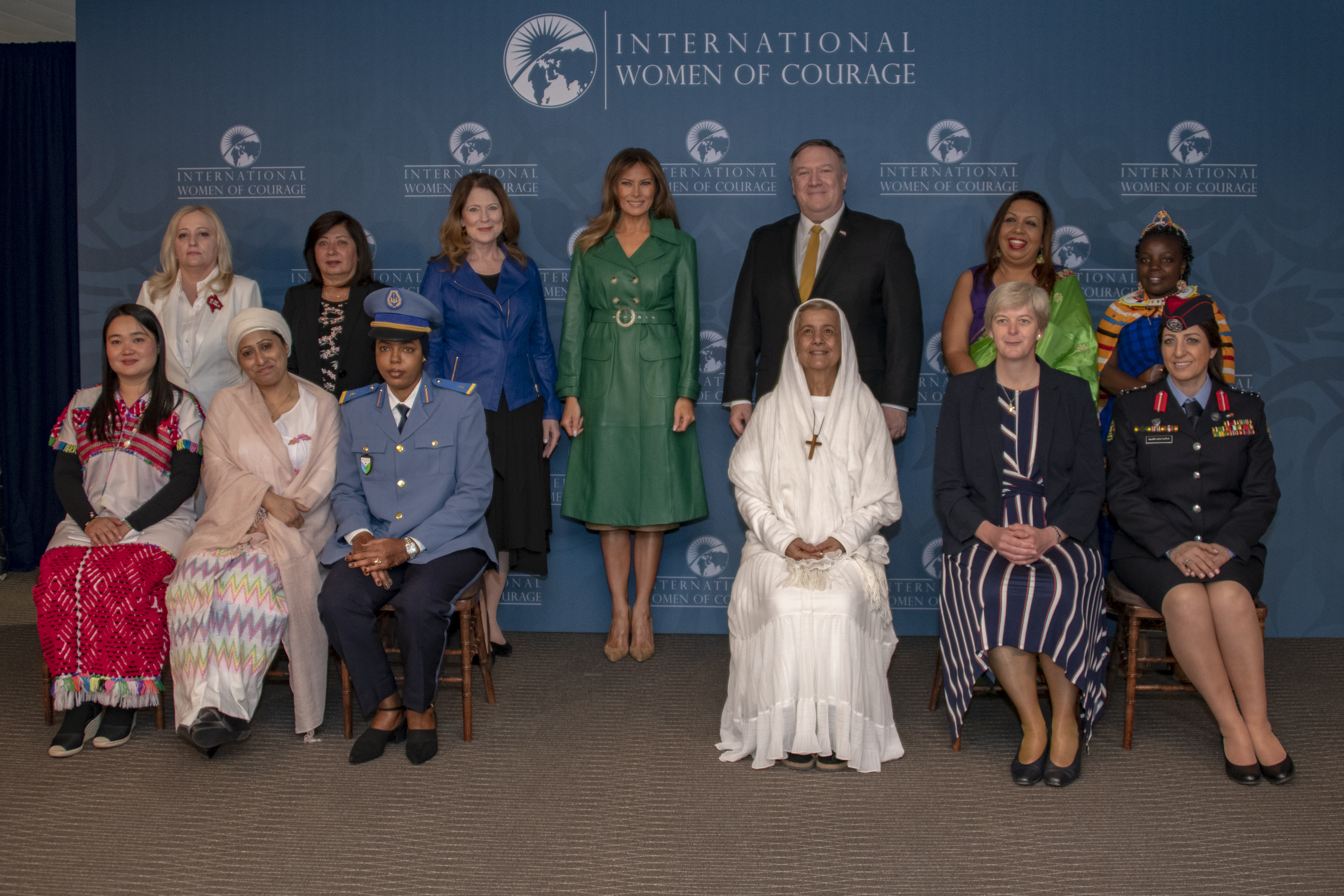
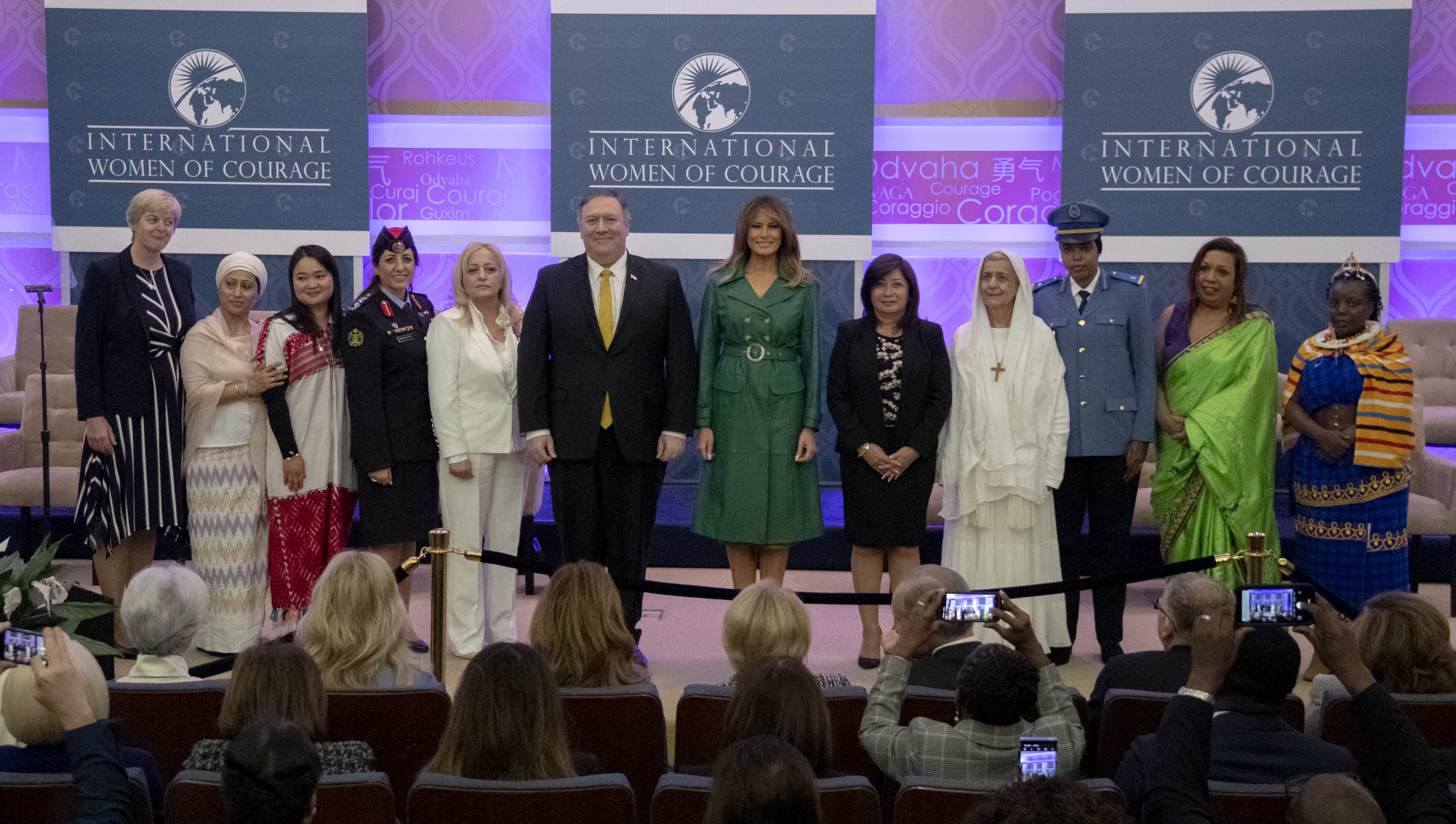
Anna Aloys Henga poses with other fellow recipients of the 2019 International Women of Courage Award
