= Kahe language =

Bantu language spoken in Tanzania

Kahe
- Native to: Tanzania
- Region: near Moshi
- Native speakers: (2,700 cited 1987)
- Language family: Niger–Congo?: Atlantic–Congo; Benue–Congo; Bantoid; Bantu; Northeast Bantu; Chaga–Taita; Chaga; Kahe

Language codes
- ISO 639-3: hka
- Glottolog: kahe1238
- Guthrie code: E.64

The Kahe is an ethnic and linguistic group based southeast of Moshi in Kilimanjaro Region Tanzania. The Kahe language, or Kikahe, is in the Chagga cluster of Bantu languages. Three dialects are recognized: Kimwangaria, Msengoni and Kichangareni. Kikahe is spoken by 9,130 people, and is one of the smaller language communities in Tanzania.
