= James Mbatia =

Tanzanian politician and engineer

Honourable James Mbatia MP

Member of Parliament
- In office 12 June 2012 – November 2015
- Appointed by: Jakaya Kikwete
- Constituency: None (Nominated MP)
- In office November 2015 – November 2020
- Preceded by: Augustino Mrema
- Succeeded by: Charles Kimei
- Constituency: Vunjo

National Chairman of NCCR-MAGEUZI
- In office 2000–2022
- Preceded by: Augustino Mrema
- Succeeded by: Haji Ambari Khamis

Personal details
- Born: 10 June 1964 (age 62) Tanganyika
- Party: NCCR–Mageuzi
- Relations: Salome Joseph Mbatia
- Education: Kilimanjaro Boys Secondary School; Tambaza Secondary School; Hanze University
- Profession: Engineer • Politician

James Francis Mbatia (born 10 June 1964) is a Tanzanian NCCR–Mageuzi politician and engineer.
