= Maria Kamm =

Tanzanian educator, politician, philanthropist (born 1937)

- Born: 1937 (age 88–89); Iringa, Tanzania
- Other name: Mama Kamm
- Education: Syracuse University
- Occupations: Teaching; Counselling
- Political party: Chama Cha Mapinduzi
- Board member of: Layra Africa
- Spouse: George Kamm

Maria Josephine Kamm (born 1937) is a Tanzanian educator, politician and philanthropist. She has been recognized nationally for her impact on women's education in Tanzania.

== Background and education ==
Kamm was born in June, 1937 in Iringa, Tanzania. She attended Tosamaganga Secondary School in Iringa, and went to Loleza Girls Secondary School in Mbeya before finishing high school at Kilakala Secondary School in Morogoro. She enrolled at Saint Mary's College to obtain her bachelor's degree. Completing a college degree was unusual for a woman at the time, as most schooling for women in Tanzania ended at Form II.

She then attended Syracuse University in New York City where she received her master's degree, becoming one of the first women from Tanzania to earn a degree in the United States.

== Career ==
Kamm started teaching in 1965. At this time, theories of education were being widely discussed in Africa, as countries moved away from colonial government and educational systems, and established their own models. In 1967, the government of Tanzania issued a policy urging participatory pedagogy and practical education in schools.

In the early years of her career, Kamm taught at Machame Girls Secondary School and Rugambwa Secondary School. She then became headmistress of Weruweru Secondary School, a public girls' school in the Kilimanjaro region, leading the school from 1970 to 1992.

Kamm did not believe that girls who were pregnant should be expelled, but this was the policy of the government at the time. As a result, she started her own parallel school, the Kilimanjaro Academy, for girls who dropped out of government schools because of pregnancy. She also founded the Mama Clementine Foundation in 1988, a non-profit organization dedicated to providing education to under-privileged girls.

She also briefly entered politics and became a member of Parliament, winning a special seat for Tanzanian Mainland. Her interest in politics was sparked by Julius Nyerere and his philosophies on education and democracy.

In retirement, Kamm has continued to be an advocate for quality education for girls. She is an honorary member and patron for Lyra Africa, a non-profit working on addressing the UN Sustainable Development Goals, including girls education. She was the chairperson of Dodoma Christian Medical Center Trust from 2003 to 2015. She also helped found the Mwalimu Nyerere Foundation.

== Impact on women's education in Tanzania ==
Affectionately known as "Mama Kamm", she has been recognized nationally for her work, and is considered a role model for women in the country.

In 2014, Kamm was selected as the Tanzanian Woman of the Year, for her work in education. She was also featured in an episode on the Tanzanian television program Malkia wa Nguvu ("Strong Queen"), which features women who have achieved success.

Notburga Aphonce Maskini, former vice-president of Trade Union Congress of Tanzania and former chief administrative officer in the prime minister's office, cites Kamm as one of her role models. She credits Kamm for her role in helping women advance in Tanzania. She said, "Her earnest heart, her work as a headmistress, and patroness has resulted in our country getting outstanding leadership."

== Awards ==
Kamm has received several awards for her work:

- 2011, The Women of Achievement Award (Life Time Achievement)
- 2014, Tanzania Woman of the Year, from Global Publishers
- 2018, Malkia wa Nguvu Prize, Clouds Media
