= Fuya Godwin Kimbita =

Tanzanian politician

Honorable Fuya Kimbita MP

Member of Parliament Hai constituency
- In office November 2005 – November 2010
- Succeeded by: Freeman Mbowe

Personal details
- Born: Fuya Godwin Kimbita; 7 November 1967 (age 58) Kilimanjaro Region, Tanzania
- Party: Chama Cha Mapinduzi

Fuya Godwin Kimbita (born 7 November 1967) is a Tanzanian CCM politician and Member of Parliament for Hai constituency in the National Assembly of Tanzania since 2005.
