= Rombo language =

Bantu language spoken in Tanzania

Rombo
- Kirombo
- Native to: Tanzania
- Region: Kilimanjaro Region, Chaga area
- Native speakers: 200,000 (2009)
- Language family: Niger–Congo?: Atlantic–Congo; Benue–Congo; Bantoid; Bantu; Northeast Bantu; Chaga–Taita; Chaga; Rombo

Language codes
- ISO 639-3: rof
- Glottolog: romb1244
- Guthrie code: E.623 (ex-E.62c)

The Rombo language, or Kirombo, is a Bantu language of Tanzania spoken by the Rombos in the area of the Kilimanjaro region. Rombo forms a dialect continuum with other Chaga languages.

== Dialects ==
The dialects of Rombo are Useri (Kiseri), Mashati (Kimashati), Mkuu (Kimkuu), Mengwe (Kimengwe), and Kimahida; Kiseri is said to be the original form of the Rombo language.

== See also ==
- Tanzania
