= Andrew Tarimo =

Tanzanian irrigation engineer

- Born: Kilimanjaro Region
- Occupations: Researcher, University teacher, Engineer, Professor

Andrew Tarimo (born in Kilimanjaro, Tanzania) is a Tanzanian academic professor and researcher of Chagga heritage, who is specialized in irrigation engineering and water management systems. He is also providing lectures and supervision at the Sokoine University of Agriculture Department of Engineering Sciences and Technology, previously the Department of Agriculture Engineering and Land Planning.

External videos
- "Professor Andrew Tarimo from Sokoine University of Agriculture, one of leading groundwater researchers across Africa interviewed by UPGro Futures Africa Ground Water Research 2016

== Selected works ==
- Nuwagaba, Augustus; Tarimo, Andrew (30 December 2010). Enhancing water for food: poverty reduction through improved management of ecosystem services for sustainable food production in sub-Saharan Africa. Ecosystems Services for Poverty Alleviation.

== See also ==
- Tolly Mbwette – Tanzanian academic (1956-2020)
