= Jumbe Rajab Jumbe =

Jumbe Rajab Jumbe (19 March 1940 – 26 October 2005) was a Tanzanian politician and member of the opposition party Chama cha Demokrasia na Maendeleo (CHADEMA).

Originally from the island of Zanzibar, Jumbe was nominated as CHADEMA's vice-presidential candidate for the upcoming national elections which were scheduled for 30 October 2005. He died four days before the poll, which prompted the National Electoral Commission (NEC) to delay the election until 14 December.

Anna Komu was selected as Jumbe's replacement and will contest the election on the ticket with CHADEMA presidential candidate Freeman Mbowe.
