= Elifuraha Marealle =

Tanganyikan Politician

Nominated Member of the Legislative Council
- In office 1955–

Personal details
- Died: 16 October 2015 (aged 86) Moshi, Tanzania

Elifuraha Ndesamburo Urio Marealle (died 16 October 2015) was a Tanganyikan politician. In 1955 she was one of the first three women appointed to the Legislative Council.

== Biography ==
Marealle attended Ashira Girls School in Moshi, and later taught at the school. In September 1948 she married Thomas Marealle, paramount chief of the Chaga people.

In 1955 she was appointed to the Legislative Council as one of the first three female members, the only African amongst the three. In the same year she was a delegate to the Marangu conference of the Lutheran Church as a representative of the Evangelical Lutheran Church of Tanganyika, where she was a keynote speaker. She became a member of the YWCA in the 1960s and worked at TANESCO.

She died in October 2015 after several years of illness.
