= Hassan Mtenga =

Tanzanian politician

Honorable Hassan Mtenga MP

Member of Parliament
- Incumbent
- Assumed office 2020
- Preceded by: Maftaha Nachuma
- Constituency: Mtwara Urban

Personal details
- Citizenship: Tanzanian
- Party: Chama Cha Mapinduzi

Hassan Mtenga (from Mtwara Region) is a Tanzanian politician currently serves as a Chama Cha Mapinduzi's Member of Parliament for Mtwara Urban constituency since November 2020.

== See also ==
- Adolf Mkenda
