= Chaga languages =

Bantu dialect continuum

Chaga
- Geographic distribution: Kilimanjaro
- Ethnicity: Chaga people
- Linguistic classification: Niger–Congo?: Atlantic–Congo; Volta-Congo; Benue–Congo; Bantoid; Southern Bantoid; Bantu; Northeast Bantu; Kilimanjaro-Taita; Kilimanjaro Bantu; Chaga

Language codes
- Glottolog: chag1250

- Person: Mchaga
- People: Wachaga
- Language: Kichaga
- Country: Uchaggani

Chaga, also Kichaga or Kichagga, is a Bantu dialect continuum spoken by the Chaga people of northern Tanzania, south of Mount Kilimanjaro. They also speak nine dialects: Kivunjo, Kimarangu, Kirombo, Kimachame, Kisiha, Kikibosho, Kiuru, Kioldimoshi and Kingassa.

The Chaga languages are:

- West Kilimanjaro (West Chaga), including Meru and Machame
- Central Kilimanjaro (Central Chaga), including Mochi (Old Moshi) and Wunjo
- Rombo
- Rusha (Arusha-Chini)
- Kahe
- Gweno
