= Patrick E. Ngowi =

Tanzanian entrepreneur

Patrick Epaphra Ngowi
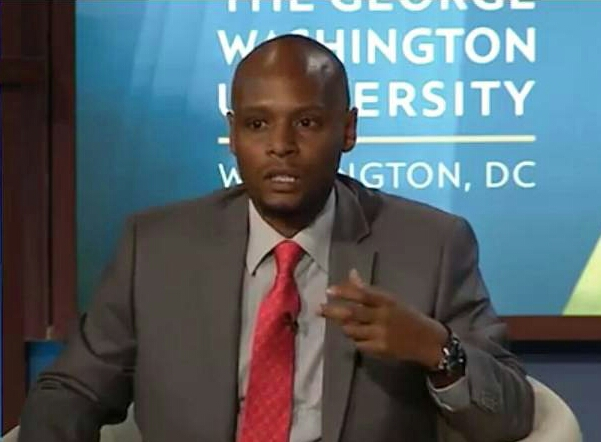
- Born: January 25, 1985 (age 41); Tanzania
- Education: Wenzhou University
- Occupations: Entrepreneur, businessperson
- Known for: Renewable Energy Entrepreneur

Patrick Epaphra Ngowi is a Tanzanian entrepreneur, businessperson, environmentalist, Al Gore's climate change reality leader and United Nations' Sustainable Development Goal 7 (SDG 7) Pioneer. Patrick has founded and led several businesses over the course of his career.

== Early life and education ==
Ngowi was born on the 25 January 1985 in Tanzania. Ngowi started his first business at age 15 when he started selling top-up vouchers for mobile phones in high school. He went on to study renewable energy in China's Wenzhou University.

== Career ==
After graduating, Ngowi travelled between China and Tanzania and brought back trendy and cheap phones, and began buying inexpensive phones from low-cost manufacturers and selling them in the Tanzanian market.

Patrick Ngowi founded Helvetic Solar in 2007 to provide and install solar equipment in Tanzania. The company was awarded KPMG's No. 1 of the Top 100 Mid Sized Companies in Tanzania Award in 2012. The firm has since evolved into a diversified business group, of which he Chairs.

== Recognition ==
Forbes included Ngowi in its list of 30 under 30 Africa's Best Young Entrepreneurs and Forbes list of Young African Millionaires to Watch in 2013. He was again listed in the 2014 list of Africa's Most Promising Young Entrepreneurs through Helvetic Group. He was also named as East Africa's Young Business Leader of the Year 2014 by Forbes and CNBC.

Ngowi has had multiple speaking roles at international events and in 2015 was elected as Chairman of the United Nations Global Compact in Tanzania. A year later, it was announced by the United Nations Secretary General that Ngowi was one of the United Nations' Sustainable Development Goals (SGDs) Global 10 Pioneers, being a pioneer in providing access to clean energy, SDG 7.

He has been recognised as:

- United Nations SDG 7 Pioneer 2016, 2017, 2018, 2019, 2020, 2021 & 2022 New York, USA.
- 2016 100 Most Influential Young Africans, Johannesburg, South Africa.
- East Africa Young Business Leader of the Year Award 2014 (AABLA) Nairobi, Kenya.
- Top 100 Young Economic Leaders 2014 - Choiseul Institute, Paris, France.
- Top 100 Most Influential Africans 2013-2014 Lagos, Nigeria.

== Philanthropy ==
Ngowi has provided free solar systems for youth and women in rural and off-grid parts of Tanzania throughout his career.
