= The Institute of Finance Management =

Public institute in Dar es Salaam, Tanzania

Institute of Finance Management
- Chuo cha Usimamizi wa Fedha (Swahili)
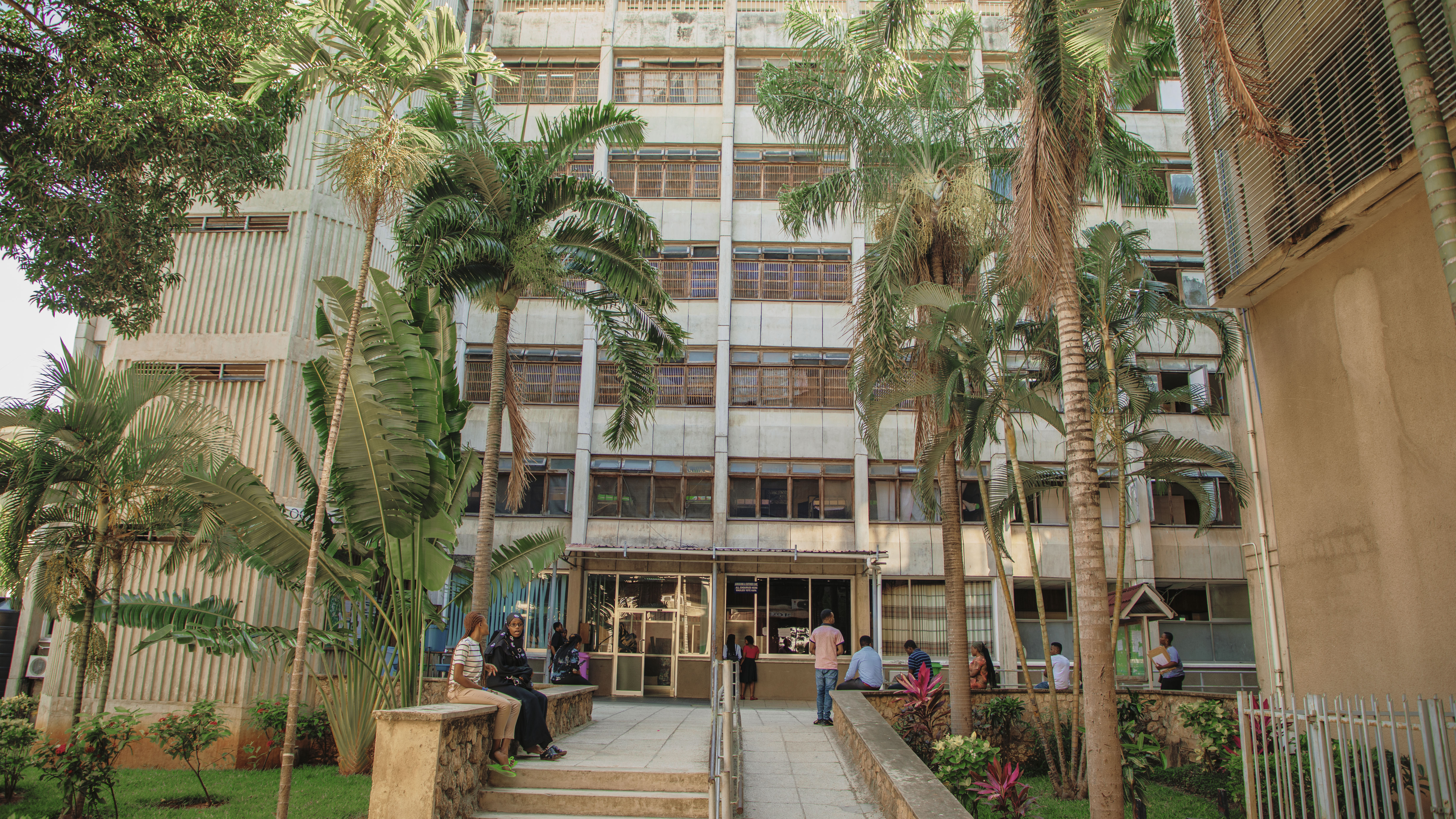
- Motto: Jifunze Uhudumie (Swahili)
- Type: Public
- Established: 1972
- Affiliations: Strathclyde University, Indian Institute of Foreign Trade, Avinashilingham University
- Officer in charge: Prof. Henry Chalu
- Rector: Prof. Henry Chalu
- Academic staff: 300+
- Administrative staff: 140 +
- Students: 16,568
- Undergraduates: 15,266
- Postgraduates: 1000+
- Location: Dar es Salaam, Tanzania
- Campus: Main Campus, Mwanza Campus, Simiyu Campus, Dodoma Campus, Geita Campus and Zanzibar Campus
- Colours: Blue, white and gold
- Website: www.ifm.ac.tz

The Institute of Finance Management (IFM) is a public Institute in Tanzania established in 1972. It stands as the oldest higher learning financial institution in Tanzania. The institute has been involved in teaching, research, and consultancy.

== Faculties ==
The Institute of Finance Management has four main faculties as of 2020:

- Faculty of Computing and Mathematics.
- Faculty of Business and Economics.
- Faculty of Insurance and Banking.

The IFM main campus is located in Dar es Salaam City Centre, Shaaban Robert Street, opposite the National Museum of Tanzania.

The Institute of Finance Management has four campuses serving different areas. They are:

- Mwanza Campus.
- Dodoma Campus.
- Simiyu Campus.
- Geita Campus.
- Zanzibar Campus.

== Programmes offered ==
The institute provides training at different levels, from postgraduate level to basic technician level, as shown below:

=== Masters Programmes ===
- Master of Science in Accounting and Finance (MAF)
- Master of Science in Finance and Investment (MFI)
- Master of Human Resources Management with Law (MHRML)
- Master of Banking and Information System Management (MBISM)
- Master of Science in Insurance and Actuarial Science (MIA)
- Master of Science in Social Protection Policy and Development (MSPPD)
- Master of Science in Cyber Security (MSCS)
- Master of Science in Applied Data Analytics (MSADA)
- Master of Science in Taxation (MST)

=== Postgraduate Diploma Programmes ===
- Postgraduate Diploma in Accounting (PGDA)
- Postgraduate Diploma in Business Administration (PGDBA)
- Postgraduate Diploma in Financial Management (PGDFM)
- Postgraduate Diploma in Financial Risk Management (PGDFRM)
- Postgraduate Diploma in Tax Management (PGDTM)
- Postgraduate Diploma in Insurance and Risk Management (PGDIRM)
- Postgraduate Diploma in Human Resource Management (PGDHRM)

=== Diploma Programmes ===
- Ordinary Diploma in Computer Science.
- Ordinary Diploma in Information Technology.
- Ordinary Diploma in Banking and Finance.
- Ordinary Diploma in Accounting.
- Ordinary Diploma in Taxation.
- Ordinary Diploma in Insurance and Risk Management.
- Ordinary Diploma in Social Protection.

=== Basic Technician Certificate Programmes ===
- Basic Technician Certificate in Accounting.
- Basic Technician Certificate in Banking and Finance.
- Basic Technician Certificate in Computing and Information Technology.
- Basic Technician Certificate in Insurance and Social Protection.
- Basic Technician Certificate in Taxation.

=== Bachelor Degree Programmes ===
- Bachelor of Accounting (BAcc)
- Bachelor of Accounting with Information Technology (BAIT)
- Bachelor of Banking and Finance (BBF)
- Bachelor of Computer Science (BCS)
- Bachelor Degree in Cyber Security (BDCS)
- Bachelor of Science in Economics and Finance (BEF)
- Bachelor of Science in Actuarial Science (BAS)
- Bachelor of Science in Information Technology (BIT)
- Bachelor of Science in Insurance and Risk Management (BIRM)
- Bachelor of Science in Social Protection (BSP)
- Bachelor of Science in Tax Management (BTX)
- Bachelor Degree in Computer Network Systems (BDCNS)

== Gallery ==
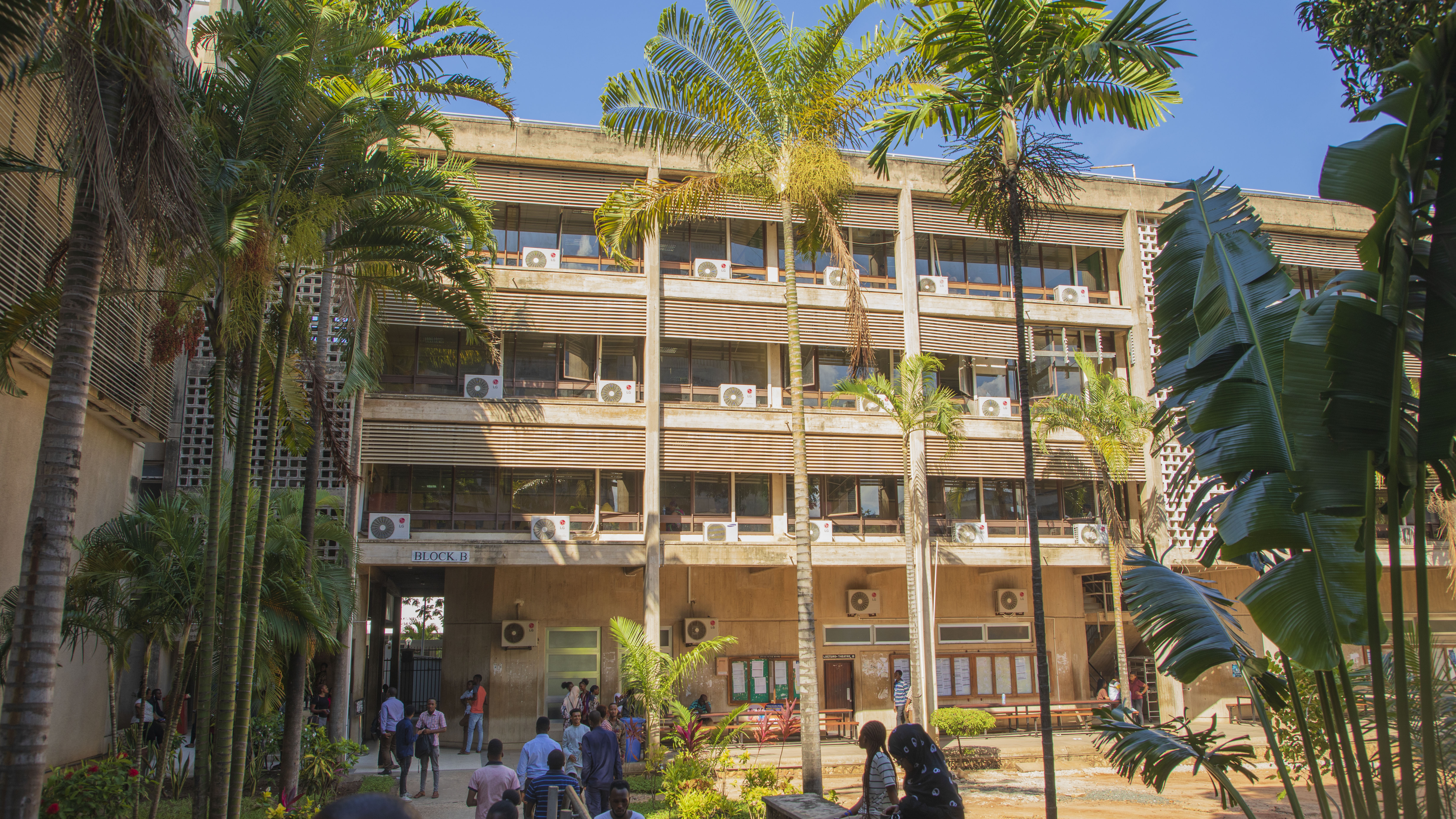
Building around IFM main campus.

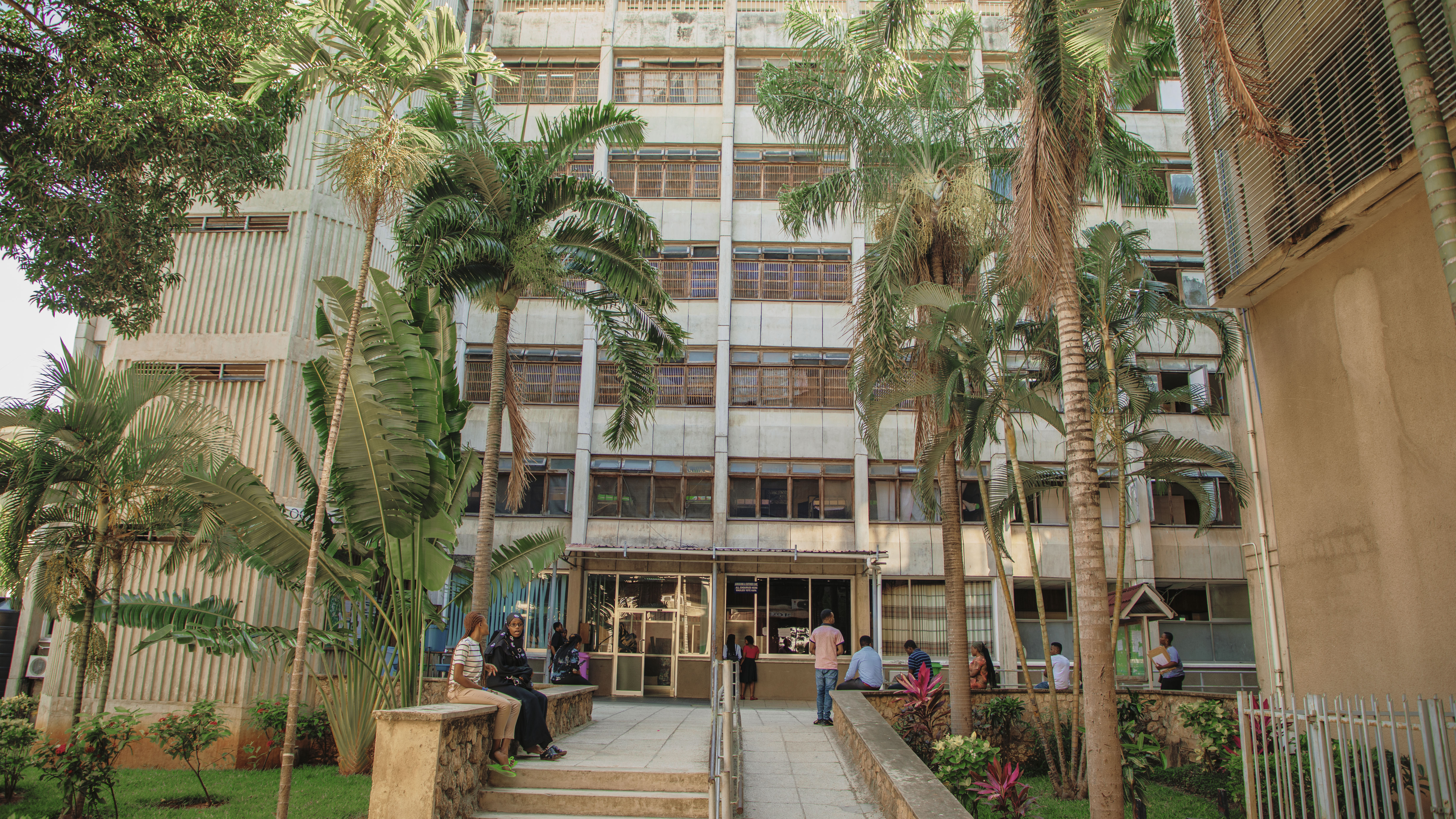
Building around IFM main campus.

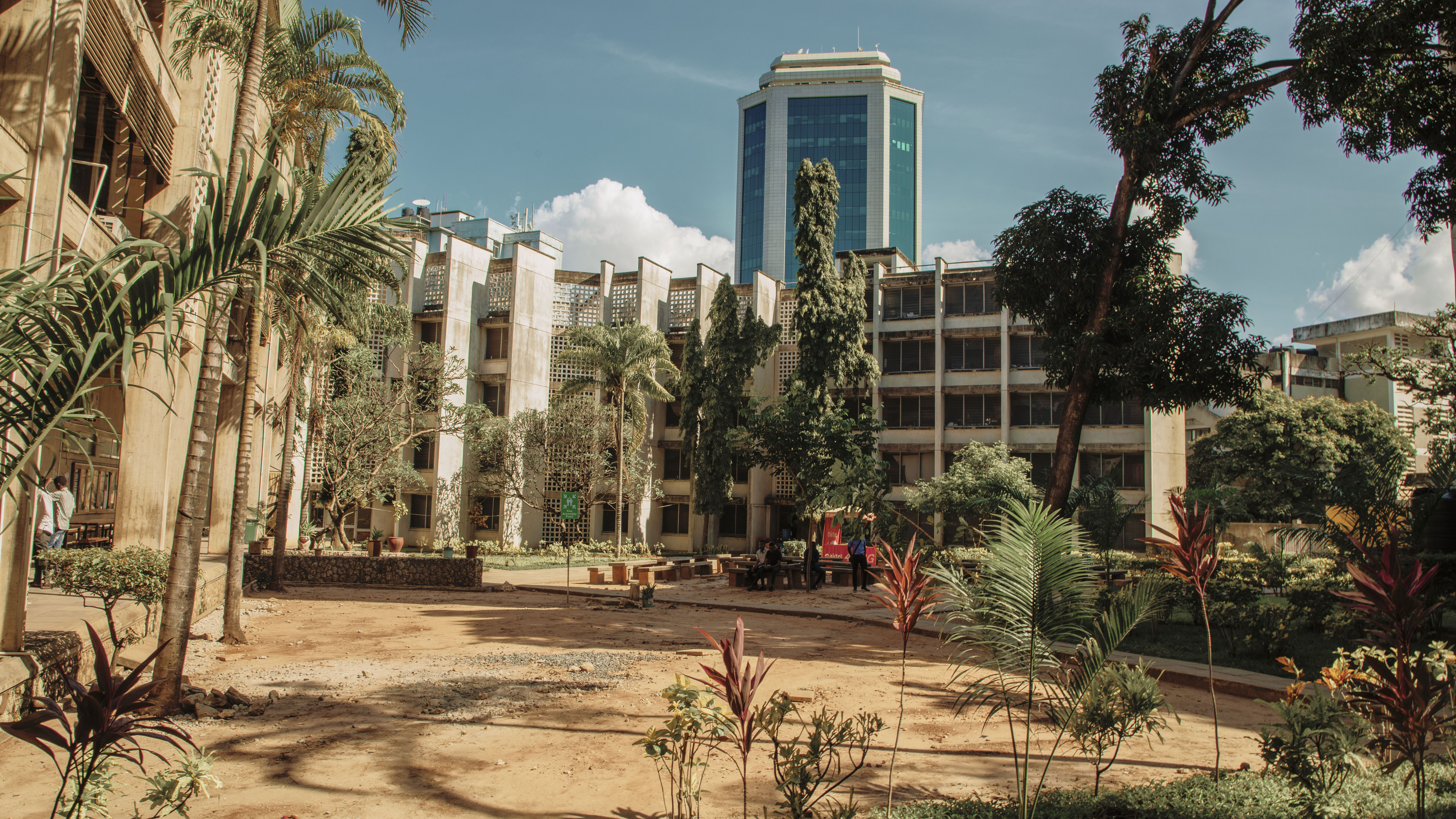
Building around IFM main campus.

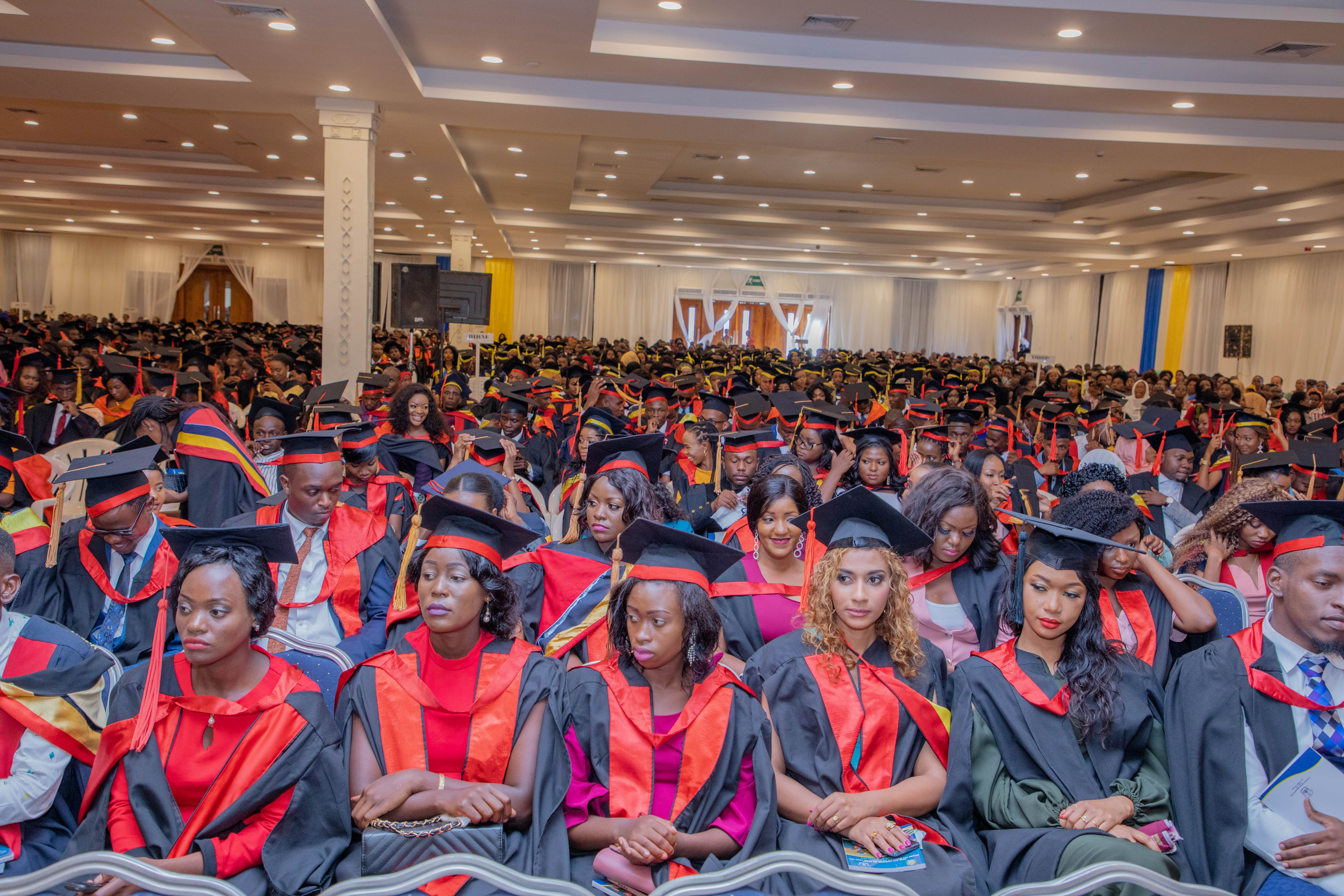
Institute of Finance management graduation ceremony 2019.

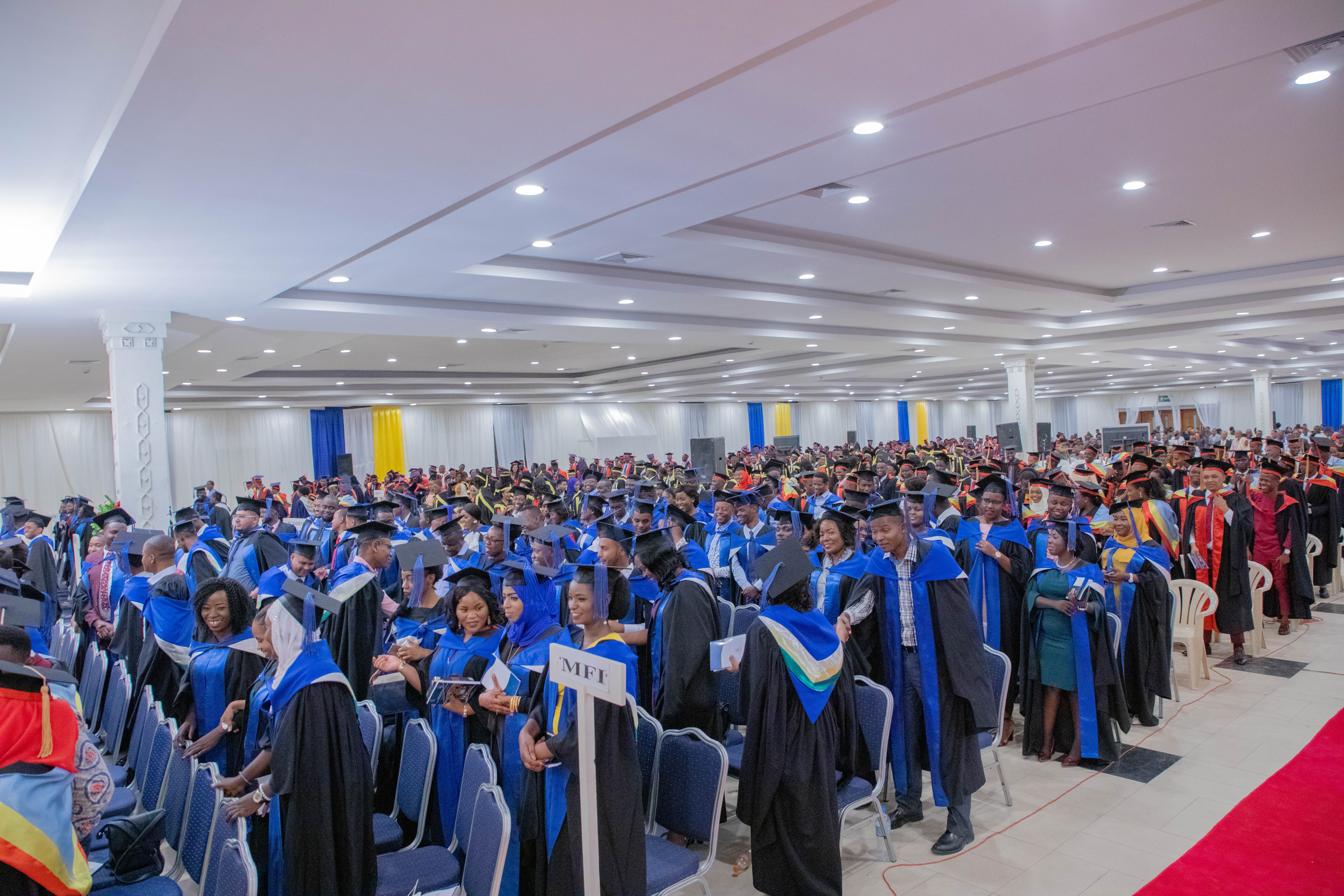
Institute of Finance management graduation ceremony, 2019.

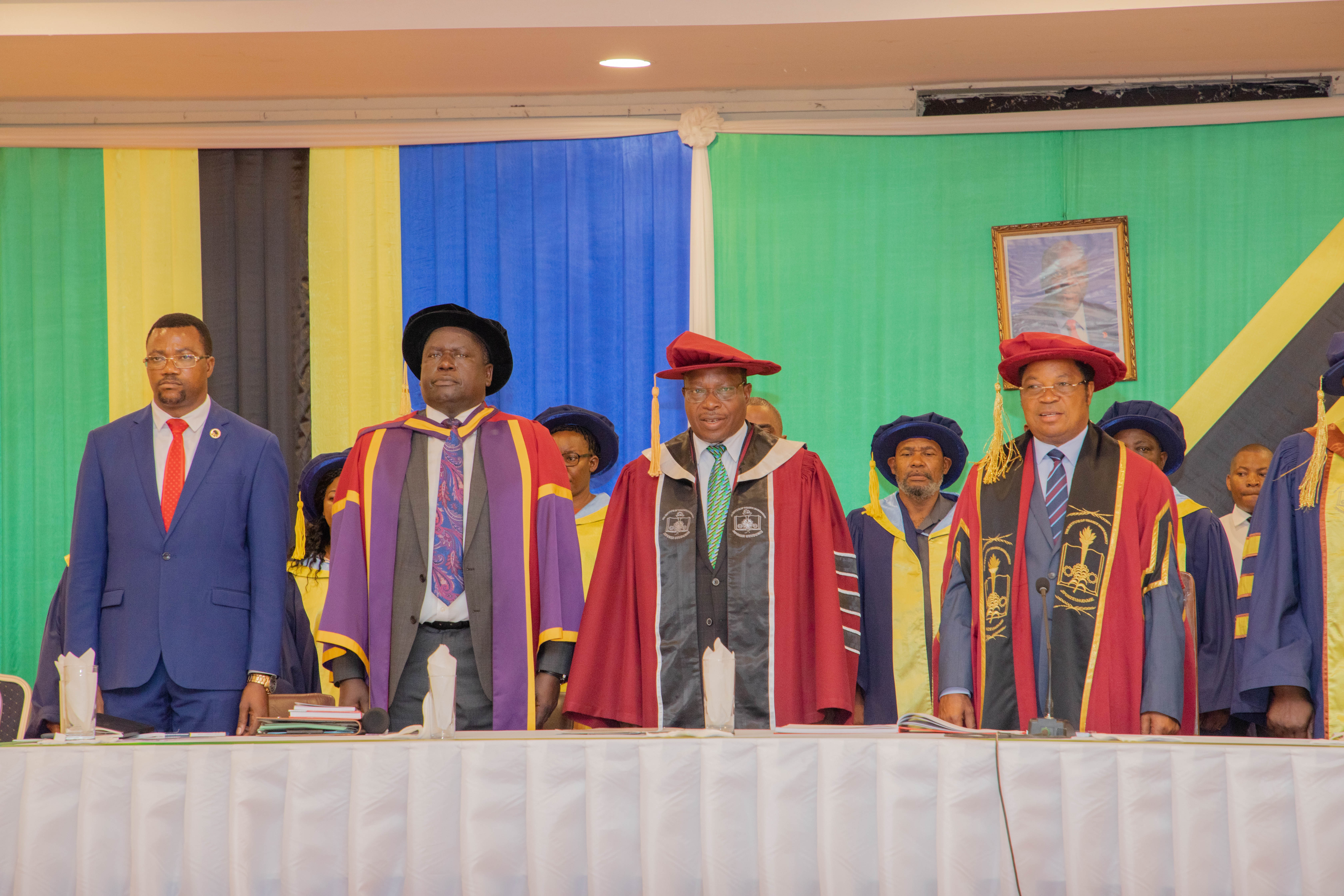
Institute of Finance management graduation ceremony 2019.

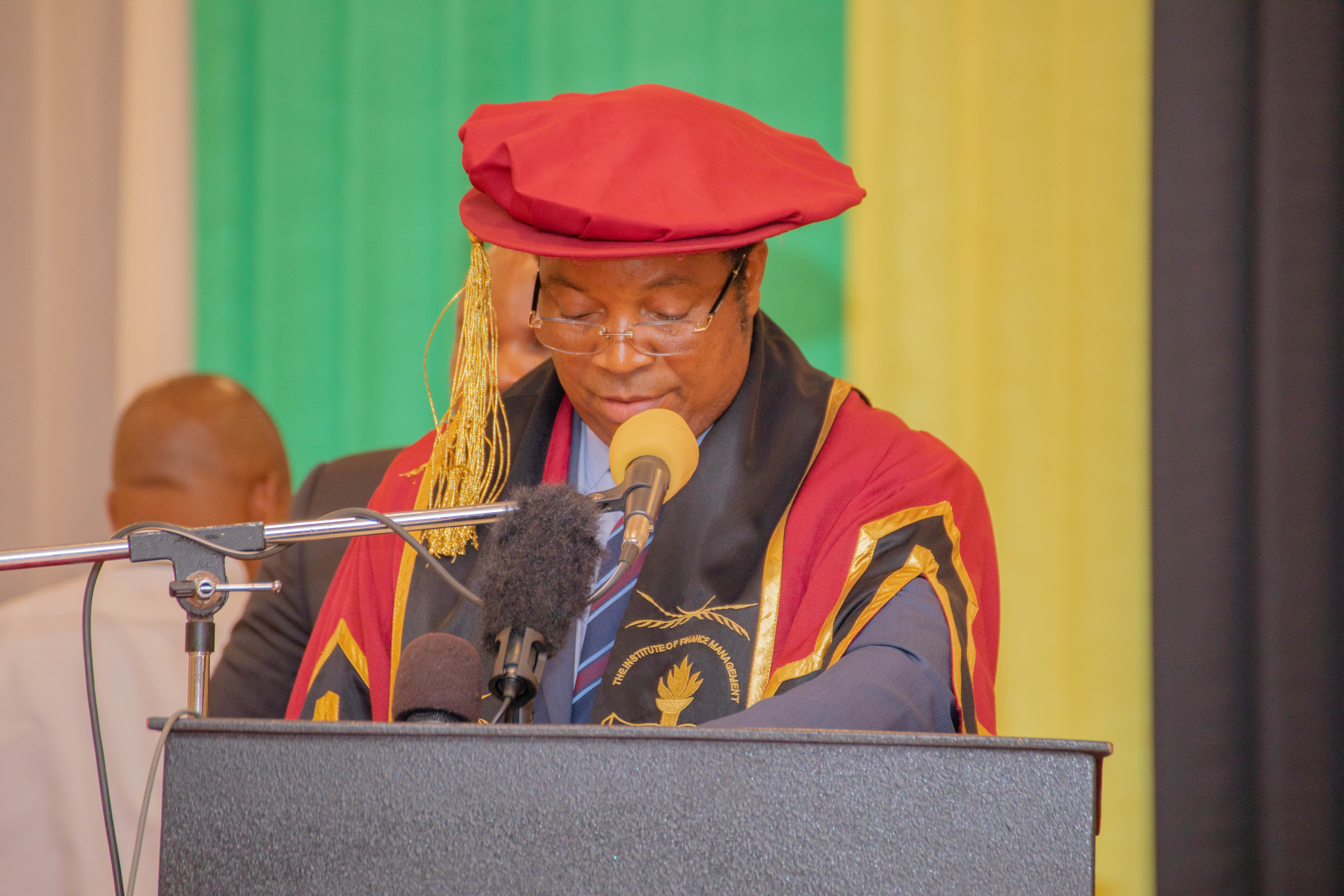
Tanzania's Prime Minister at the IFM graduation ceremony 2020.
