= Salome Joseph Mbatia =

Former MP in the Tanzanian National Assembly

Salome Mbatia MP

Member of Parliament (Tanzania)
- In office 2005–2007
- President: Jakaya Kikwete
- Constituency: Appointed special seat

Personal details
- Born: 27 December 1952
- Died: 24 October 2007 (aged 54)
- Resting place: Kirua, Kilimanjaro
- Citizenship: Tanzanian
- Party: Chama Cha Mapinduzi
- Spouse: Joseph Mbatia
- Relations: James Mbatia
- Children: 4

Salome Joseph Mbatia was a CCM Member of Parliament in the Tanzanian National Assembly and former cabinet Minister.

She was a cabinet Deputy Minister of planning, economic and empowerment and later prior to her death was a Deputy Minister of community, development, gender and children.

== Personal life ==
She had four children and was married to Dr. Joseph Mbatia.

== Biography ==
In August 2001, while a Member of Parliament, Mbatia spoke out to news outlets about the ongoing practice of female genital mutilation in Tanzania. According to her, while most traditional practices were no longer in operation, female genital mutilation was still occurring in hospitals, and efforts by the government should be directed to end it.

Later that year, in September, Mbatia took part in the 2001 Global Summit of Women in Hong Kong, China. She was one of thirty participants in a parade of female leaders from around the world which displayed the range of female leadership.

In 2005, Jakaya Kikwete won the general election and became president of Tanzania. In his administration, Mbatia was appointed Deputy Minister of Planning, Economy, and Empowerment alongside Minister Juma Ngasongwa. She later became Deputy Minister of Community Development, Gender, and Children.

=== Death ===
Mbatia was killed on 24 October 2007 in a car accident while in Iringa, Njombe District, when a Fuso truck hit the car she was riding in head-on. The incident was the third car accident which involved lawmakers or ministers in the last two months. Her body was flown to the Julius Nyerere International Airport the day after for a reception from other ministers and government officials, including Vice President Ali Shein, Prime Minister Edward Lowassa, and Speaker of Parliament Samuel Sitta. From there, it was taken to Kirua near Kilimanjaro for the funeral and burial.
