= Anna Komu =

Tanzanian politician

Mrs Anna Komu
- Born: 1950/01/15; Zanzibar
- Citizenship: Tanzania
- Organization(s): Community Development, Gender and Children.
- Known for: Tanzania Politician
- Political party: Chama cha Demokrasia na Maendeleo (CHADEMA)

Anna Maulidah Valerian Komu (born 15 January 1950 in Zanzibar - died 28 April 2026 in Zanzibar) was a Tanzanian politician. She was a member of Tanzania's ruling party Chama Cha Mapinduzi (CCM) until the introduction of multiparty politics in Tanzania. She was then a member of Chama cha Demokrasia na Maendeleo (CHADEMA).

She was Freeman Mbowe's running mate in the 2005 Tanzania presidential election. Their party lost to CCM. She was also the Shadow Minister for Community Development, Gender and Children.
