= Freeman Mbowe =

Tanzanian politician

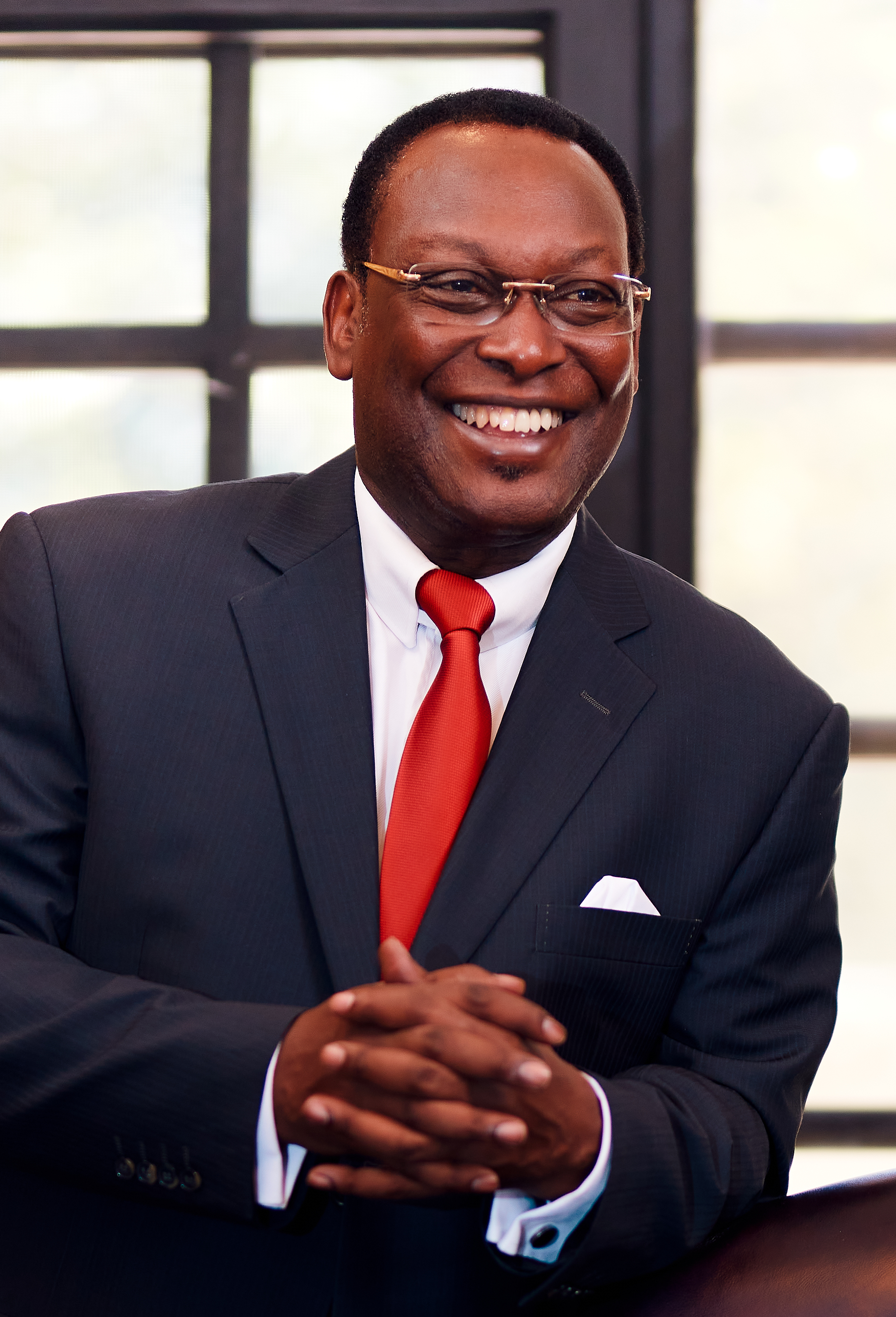
- Freeman Mbowe in 2022

Member of Parliament Hai Constituency
- In office 2010–2020
- Preceded by: Fuya Godwin Kimbita
- Succeeded by: Saasisha Mafuwe

Chairman of CHADEMA
- Incumbent
- Assumed office 2005

Personal details
- Born: Freeman Aikaeli Mbowe; 14 September 1961 (age 65) Kilimanjaro, Tanzania
- Party: Chadema
- Relations: Edwin Mtei (Father-in-law)
- Occupation: Politician

Freeman Aikaeli Mbowe (born 14 September 1961) is a Tanzanian politician and former chairman of Chama cha Demokrasia na Maendeleo.

He was elected as a National Assembly member representing the Hai District in the Kilimanjaro Region as from 2010 to 2020.

Mbowe was elected to the National Assembly in 2000 representing Hai Constituency (Kilimanjaro Region). He won 64.5% of the vote, which was the highest percentage of votes won among constituencies with opposition MPs.

In preparation for the 2005 elections, Mbowe was nominated to represent Chadema as their presidential candidate for the 2005 presidential elections. Jumbe Rajab Jumbe, a Zanzibari was chosen as his vice-presidential candidate. The election was originally scheduled for 30 October 2005, but was postponed until 14 December due to the death of Jumbe.

Mbowe constructively criticized the lengthy postponement, saying a week's delay would have sufficed and that his political party cannot afford to finance extra campaigns. Chadema eventually settled on Anna Komu to be the running political party executive.

He placed third out of ten candidates in the presidential election of 14 December 2005, winning 5.88% of the vote. In the 2010 general elections, he was elected as a member of parliament for the United Republic of Tanzania parliament after winning against the experienced candidate the incumbent from Mapinduzi, Fuya Godwin Kimbita taking 51.63% of the vote.

One of the founders of Chadema in 1992, Mbowe is currently one of the main strategists of the Chadema political party and a main executive board member in the political party to ensure the political growth of his party, of which he has steadily led as chairman since 2004, in a healthy politically competitive environment that has witnessed a steady collapse of major opposition parties since the 1990s at the hands of the CCM government.

In July 2021, Freeman Mbowe was arrested along with ten other members of the party left for Mwanza (North-West) where they were planning a rally. The state eventually accused him of terrorism. He remained in remand prison as his charges are unbailable in Tanzania.

In March 2022, Tanzania prosecutors dropped the terrorism case against him. Following his release and his immediate conversation with President Samia Suluhu, his first appearance days later was at the International Women's Day event in Iringa in 2022. This caused critics to accuse Suluhu of releasing Mbowe on condition of support for Western feminist policies.

In August 2024, Mbowe was arrested again, along with 520 other Chadema supporters in a nationwide crackdown. Mbowe was later released on bail, a day after his arrest. He was again arrested the following month.
