= Ruth Meena =

Tanzanian feminist activist and educator

- Born: 1946 (age 79–80); Kilimanjaro Region, Tanganyika Territory (now Tanzania)
- Education: Ashira Girls Secondary School; Agha Khan High School
- Alma mater: University of Dar-es-Salaam
- Occupations: Activist; Professor; Writer

Ruth E. Meena (born 1946) is a Tanzanian feminist activist and political scientist. She was a professor in the Department of Political Science and Public Administration at the University of Dar es Salaam.

== Life ==
Ruth Meena was born in 1946, and received early education near Moshi, Tanzania. After studying at the Ashira Middle Girls Boarding School, she wanted to continue to higher education. Despite lacking the support of her father, who wanted her to take a teacher training course, she managed to plead her own case to receive local government assistance to attend the H. H. Aga Khan High School in Dar es Salaam, and then proceeded to the University of Dar es Salaam, where she successfully took three degrees.

Meena became professor in the Department of Political Science and Public Administration at the University of Dar es Slaam, until her retirement. She introduced the first course in gender and politics at the university. In 1991 she became coordinator of the gender unit of the Southern Africa Political Trust (SAPE). In 1995 she founded and became head of the Environmental, Human Rights, and Gender Organization (Envirocare). She has worked with other national women's rights organizations such as the Tanzania Media Women Association, Tanzania Women Lawyers Association, and the Gender Dimensions Task Force. More recently she has been chair of Women Fund Tanzania (WFT), as well as chair of the Coalition of Women and Constitution Tanzania (CWCT).

In 2013 Meena was among women's rights leaders calling for those drafting the amended Constitution of Tanzania to safeguard women's rights more explicitly. Meena welcomed the new constitution as a milestone in dealing with discrimination against women. In 2018 she called for gender inequalities to be addressed at the level of local government. In 2020 she called for a more level playing field, to allow women to compete more equally for leadership positions in Tanzania. Presenting the findings of a WFT review of existing election law in May 2020, she called for political parties to ensure equal participation of women and men, for the media to give coverage to women contestants, and for special seats parliamentarians to be given the same privileges as other MPs. She spoke at the funeral of Benjamin Mkapa, recalling Mkapa's implementation of four of the recommendations of the 1995 Beijing Conference.

== Works ==
- Matatizo y nchi zinazoendelea [Problems in developing countries]. Dar es Salaam: Longman Tanzania, [1981]
- Historia fupi ya jumuiya ya Afrika Mashariki tangu 1900–1975 [A brief history of the East African community, 1900–1975]. Dar es Salaam: Longman Tanzania, 1981.
- Siasa ya Tanzania kuhusu nchi za nje [Tanzania's foreign policy], Dar es Salaam: Longman Tanzania, 1982.
- (ed.) Gender in southern Africa: conceptual and theoretical issues. Harare: SAPES Books, 1992.
- National machinery for the advancement of women in Tanzania. Accra North, Ghana: Third World Network-Africa, 2000.
- 'The Female Husband', in Amandina Lihamba et al., eds., Women Writing Africa: The eastern region. Feminist Press at the City University of New York, 2007, pp. 440–42
- (with Mary Rusimbi) our journey to empowerment: the role of ICT, in Ineke Buskens and Anne Wbb, eds., African Women and ICTs: Creating New Spaces with Technology, pp.193–
- Women participation in the election process of 2015 in Tanzania. Oxfam, 2015.
- (with Mary Rusimbi and Caroline Israel) Women and political leadership: facilitating factors in Tanzania, Dar es Salaam, Tanzania : Uongozi Institute, 2018.
