= Saasisha Mafuwe =

Tanzanian Politician

Honorable Saasisha Mafuwe MP

Member of Parliament Hai constituency
- Incumbent
- Assumed office November 2020
- Preceded by: Freeman Mbowe

Personal details
- Born: 10 October 1982 (age 43) Hai District, Kilimanjaro Region, Tanzania
- Education: Kivukoni Secondary School; Kinondoni High School; St. Augustine University of Tanzania; University of Dodoma

Saasisha Elinikyo Mafuwe (born 10 October 1982) is a Tanzanian Chama Cha Mapinduzi politician and civil servant. He is the current Member of Parliament for Hai constituency in Kilimanjaro Region since 2020.
