= Helen Kijo-Bisimba =

Tanzanian human rights activist (born 1954)

Hellen Kijo-Bisimba
- Born: 1954 (age 71–72); Kilimanjaro Region, Tanzania
- Citizenship: Tanzania
- Education: University of Warwick
- Occupations: Lawyer; activist
- Employer(s): Executive director of Legal and Human Rights Center
- Known for: Human rights, good governance
- Successor: Anna Aloys Henga
- Spouse: Emily Bisimba (deceased)
- Children: 4

Hel(l)en Kijo-Bisimba (born 1954) is a human rights activist in Tanzania. She was the executive director of Legal and Human Rights Center until she retired in 2018.

== Life ==
Kijo-Bisimba was born on October 10, 1954 in the Kilimanjaro Region in Tanzania. She went to school in the Tanga region at Korogwe High School, where she was deputy head girl. She felt unfairly victimised when she was accused of sending an insulting letter to the head teacher. The resulting suspension shaped her feeling of justice when she had to admit to the deed despite her innocence.

Despite this setback at school she went on to university in Dar es Salaam where she graduated in 1985 and then stayed on to gain a master's in Law in 1994. She went on to gain a doctorate in law from the University of Warwick.

Kijo-Bisimba was appointed as the executive director of Legal and Human Rights Center (LHRC) in 1995.

She dealt with female genital mutilation. FGM was made illegal in Tanzania in 1998, but twenty years later, it was estimated that 10% of girls still suffered this treatment.

In 2001, Kijo-Bisimba earned a (2008) "Woman of Courage" award from the US Embassy after she issued a public statement in opposition to the government. She was the first woman to make a public statement objecting to the number of people killed in Zanzibar after election protests.

Kijo-Bisimba resigned as the executive director of the Legal and Human Rights Center (LHRC) in 2018. She was replaced by Anna Aloys Henga, who was recognised in 2019 as a Woman of Courage.

In 2019, the Tanzanian Minister for Home Affairs Kangi Lugola said that he could not understand why Kijo-Bisimba had not been honoured by her country.

== Personal life ==
Kijo-Bisimba has four children, and she is a regular churchgoer.
