= Aggrey Mwanri =

Tanzanian politician

Honourable Aggrey Mwanri MP

Deputy Minister of State in the PM's Office for Regional Admin. and Local Govt.
- Incumbent
- Assumed office 28 November 2010 Serving with Majaliwa K. Majaliwa
- Minister: George Mkuchika (2010-12); Hawa Ghasia (2012-present)

Member of Parliament for Siha
- Incumbent
- Assumed office November 2000

Arusha District Commissioner
- In office 1997–2000
- President: Benjamin Mkapa

Personal details
- Born: 17 July 1955 (age 71) Tanganyika
- Party: CCM
- Education: UDSM (BA), (MA)

Aggrey Deaisile Joshua Mwanri (born 17 July 1955) is a Tanzanian CCM politician and was member of parliament for Siha constituency since 2000. He is also served as the regional commissioner and head of security council for Tabora region. He was the Deputy Minister of State in the Prime Minister's Office for Regional Administration and Local Government.
