= Central Kilimanjaro language =

Bantu language spoken in Tanzania

Central Kilimanjaro
- Central Chaga
- Native to: Tanzania
- Region: Kilimanjaro
- Ethnicity: Chaga
- Language family: Niger–Congo?: Atlantic–Congo; Volta-Congo; Benue–Congo; Bantoid; Southern Bantoid; Bantu; Northeast Bantu; Chaga–Taita; Chaga; Central Kilimanjaro
- Dialects: Mochi; Uru; Mbokomu; Wuunjo

Language codes
- ISO 639-3: Either: vun – Wunjo old – Mochi
- Glottolog: vunj1238 Vunjo moch1256 Mochi
- Guthrie code: E.622 (ex-E.62a,62b)

Central Kilimanjaro, or Central Chaga, is a Bantu language of Tanzania spoken by the Chaga people.

== Dialects ==
There are several dialects:

- Moshi (Old Moshi, Mochi, Kimochi)
- Uru
- Mbokomu
- Wuunjo (Wunjo, Vunjo, Kivunjo), including Kiruwa, Kilema, Mamba, Moramu (Marangu), Mwika

Moshi is the language of the Chaga cultural capital, Moshi, and the prestige dialect of the Chaga languages.

== Phonology ==
=== Vowels ===
	Front	Central	Back
High	i		u
Mid	e		o
Low		a	

In orthography, long vowels are written double. However, while older works suggest vowel length contrast may have formerly been phonemic, more recent works suggest the distinction has been partially or completely neutralized, unlike in West Kilimanjaro.

=== Consonants ===
Consonants in the Moshi dialect
		Labial	Alveolar	Post- alveolar	Palatal	Velar	Glottal
Nasal		m ⟨m⟩	n ⟨n⟩		ɲ ⟨ny⟩	ŋ ⟨ng'⟩	
Stop	voiceless	p ⟨p⟩	t ⟨t⟩			k ⟨k⟩	
Stop	voiced	b ⟨b⟩	d ⟨d⟩				
Stop	NC	mb ⟨mb⟩	nd ⟨nd⟩			ŋɡ ⟨ng⟩	
Affricate	voiceless	pf ⟨pf⟩	ts ⟨ts⟩	tʃ ⟨ch⟩			
Affricate	NC	mbv ⟨mpf⟩	ndz ⟨nts⟩	ndʒ ⟨nch⟩			
Fricative	voiceless	f ⟨f⟩	s ⟨s⟩	ʃ ⟨sh⟩			h ⟨h⟩
Rhotic	trill		r ⟨r⟩				
Rhotic	tap		ɾ ⟨r⟩				
Lateral			l ⟨l⟩				
Approximant		w ~ β ⟨w⟩		ɻ ⟨rh⟩	j ⟨y⟩		

- Consonants /k, ŋɡ, l/ become palatalized to [kʲ, ŋɡʲ, lʲ] when occurring before the front vowels /i, e/.
- /w/ appears as a fricative [β] when before the front vowels /i, e/.

Consonants in the Vunjo dialect
		Labial	Dental/ alveolar	Post- alveolar	Palatal	Velar	Glottal
Nasal		m ⟨m⟩	n̪ ⟨n⟩		ɲ ⟨ny⟩	ŋ ⟨ng'⟩	
Stop	voiceless	p ⟨p⟩	t̪ ⟨t⟩		c ⟨ky⟩	k ⟨k⟩	
Stop	voiced	(b) ⟨b⟩	d ⟨d⟩			(ɡ) ⟨g⟩	
Stop	NC^{‡}	m̩b ⟨mb⟩	n̩d ⟨nd⟩		ɲ̍ɟ ⟨ngy⟩	ŋ̍ɡ ⟨ng⟩	
Affricate	voiceless	pf ⟨pf⟩	ts ⟨ts⟩	tʃ ⟨c⟩			
Affricate	NC^{‡}	m̩bv ⟨mv⟩	n̩dz ⟨nz⟩	n̩dʒ ⟨nj⟩			
Fricative	voiceless	f ⟨f⟩	s ⟨s⟩	ʃ ⟨sh⟩			h ⟨h⟩
Fricative	voiced				ʝ ~ j ⟨ghy⟩	ɣ ~ w ⟨gh⟩	
Rhotic	trill		r ⟨r⟩^{†}				
Rhotic	tap		ɺ ⟨lr⟩				
Lateral			l̪ ⟨l⟩^{†}	l̠ʲ ⟨ly⟩			
Approximant		w ~ β ⟨w⟩	ɹ ⟨zr⟩^{†}		j ⟨y⟩		

- /b/ and /ɡ/ are restricted to loans. /l̠ʲ/ is native and contrasts with the [ʎ] allophone of /l̪/ but is rare.
- /t n l/ are dental, /d/ et al. are alveolar.
- The consonants /k, ŋɡ, ɣ/ and /l̪/ become palatal (and merge with the palatals) when occurring before the front vowels /i, e/.
- /w/ appears as a fricative [β] when before the front vowels /i, e/.
- The dental lateral /l̪/ is usually velarized as [ɫ̪].
- /ɹ/ is also heard as postalveolar [ɹ̠].

^{‡} NC are not prenasalized consonants but rather consonant sequences; in initial position, the nasal is syllabic.

^{†} /r/, /ɹ/ and /l̠ʲ/ may be pronounced as fricatives. /r/ being heard as an alveolar fricative trill [r̝], the /ɹ/ being heard as a retroflex fricative [ɻ̝], with an extent of frication on the palatalized lateral /l̠ʲ/ as [l̠̝ʲ].

=== Tones ===
Vunjo dialect has two underlying tones (high /H/ and low /L/) that surface as three level and five contour tones: [xH] (extra-high), [H], [L], falling [HL] and [xHL], rising [LH] and [LxH], and peaking [LHL], plus two downstepped tones [ꜝH] and [ꜝxH].

== Bibliography ==
- Dalgish, Gerard M. (1978) 'The syntax and semantics of the morpheme ni in kiVunjo (Chaga)', Kiswahili, 48, 1, 42–56.
- Philippson, Gérard (1984) '"Gens des bananeraies" (Tanzanie): contribution linguistique à l'histoire culturelle des Chaga du Kilimanjaro' (Cahier no. 16.) Paris: Editions Recherche sur les civilisations.
