= Nathaniel Mtui =

Tanzanian historian

Nahtaniel Mtui
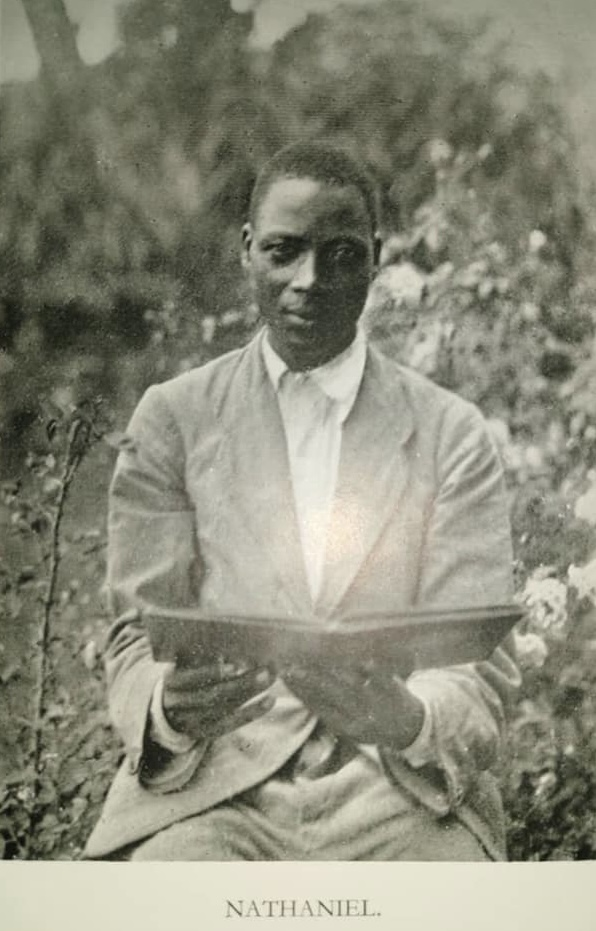
- Nathaniel Mtui c.1920s.
- Born: 1892
- Died: 1927 (aged 34–35)
- Occupations: Historian and Activist

Nathaniel Mtui was a Tanzanian historian of Chagga origin born in 1892 in the mtaa of Mshiri in Marangu, Kilimanjaro Region, Tanzania. He was a teacher at the Colonial German Lutheran mission in Marangu. He is known for being the first person of Chagga origin to write history of the Chagga people. He wrote the Chaggan history in Kichagga, German, and Swahili from 1913-1916.

During the German occupation, he wrote for German Lutheran pastors, Johannes Raum and Bruno Gutmann, who then used Mtui's notes for their own books on the Chagga people. During the British occupation Nathaniel was hired by Major Dundas, paying him 16 shillings for each full note book wrote about the Chaggan people. No one knows how many note books Mtui wrote for the 3 men, as many are missing, Gutmann preserved 9 of Mtui's note books. These 9 of Mtui's notebooks focus more on the histories of the central and eastern Chaggaland.

In 1924 Nathaniel Mtui together with Joseph Merinyo founded The Kilimanjaro Native Planters Association (KNPA). It began as a cooperative association with the goal of buying and sharing spray equipment, but it swiftly developed into an organization that markets African coffee and serves as the political arm of the mountain's growers. The KNPA vigorously lobbied the British run Moshi district office to defend their water rights, protect their coffee privileges, and give more land for the development of homesteads. They also denied the claims made by the settlers. . Nathaniel Mtui died in 1927 at the age of 35.
