= Peopling of the Kilimanjaro Corridor =

Kilimanjaro Corridor
Total population
- ~ 6,000,000

Regions with significant populations
- Tanzania: ~90%
- Kenya: ~10%

Languages
- Chaga, Taita, Taveta, Pare (Asu/Chasu), Gweno, Mbugu and Rwo.

Religion
- Christian, Islam, African indigenous religion

Related ethnic groups
- Other Bantu people, Maasai and South Cushites

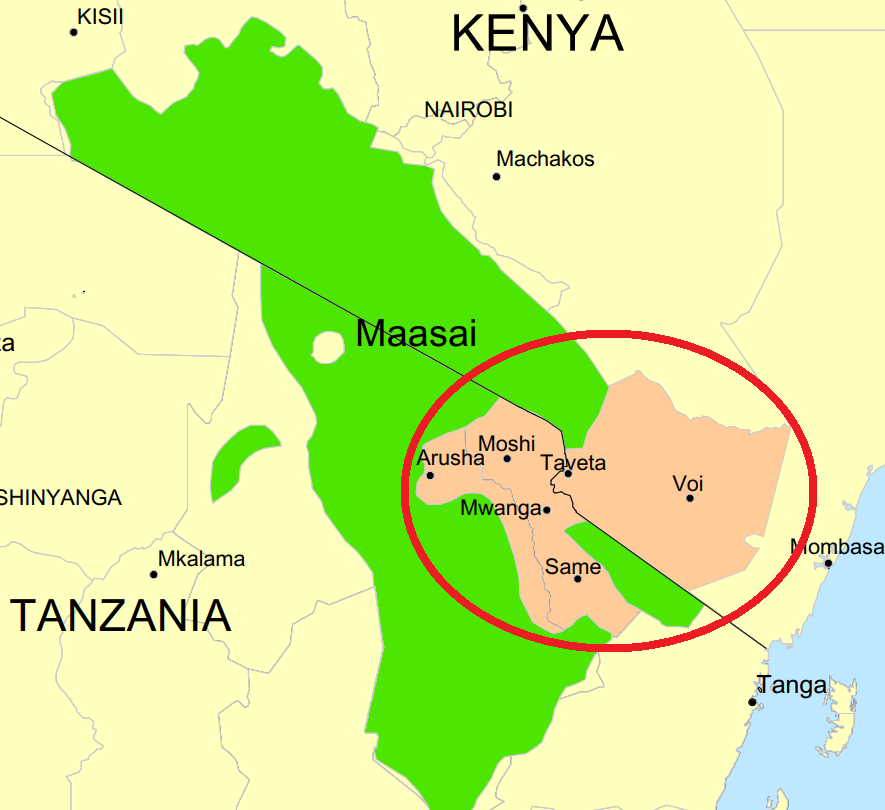
People of Arusha-Kilimanjaro-Taita-Taveta regions enclosed within Maasai territory

The boundaries of this corridor can be defined within the Maasai territory (Map 1; Map 2). The corridor stretches from the Arusha Region, through the Kilimanjaro Region of Tanzania to the Taita-Taveta County of Kenya. To varying degrees, the people in this corridor are essentially a mixture of similar Bantu (vandu, as the people), Nilotic (Maa speakers) and Cushitic (Muu, as the people) branches of the African people. The groups were dynamic, fluid and flexible. They shared a common history characterised by constant movement between the different areas for trade, battles, migration as well as social reasons. They were categorised arbitrarily by Europeans into the following culturally, linguistically and/or genetically related groups:

- Chagga
- Taita
- Pare
- Taveta
- Meru
- Arusha
- Mbugu

== Colonial ==
As it occurred throughout East Africa, the people in this corridor have been poorly characterised by early European visitors, resulting in incorrect categorisation of ethnicity, language and groups. The assumption of static tribes is foreign to the region; the indigenous population often better identify with lineages/clans. Although those early classification persists, they are acknowledged as trivial divisions by the indigenous population, as evident in the shared history and occurrence of the same lineages/clans amongst the different groups.

== Ancestry ==
Based on the dominating languages and customs (e.g. initiation, circumcision); the area is predominantly of Bantu ancestry. Genetic studies confirm this Bantu ancestry, but show notable differences to the adjacent Mijikenda bantu-speaking people reflecting their distinct cultural histories.

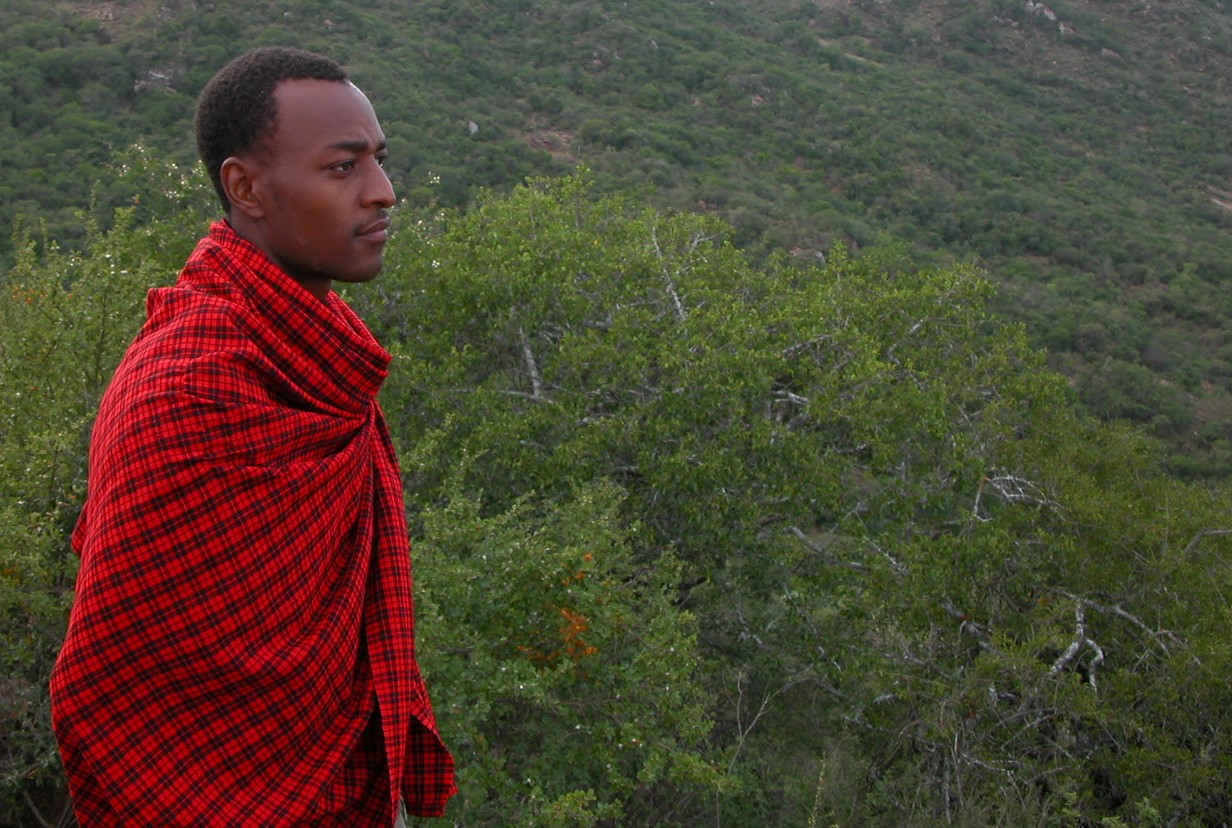
Chagga man at Mount Kilimanjaro, Tanzania

Evidence of the Cushitic ancestry is in the influence of extinct Cushitic languages on the Bantu languages that either replaced them (e.g. Taita Cushitic) or resulted in a mixed language (i.e. Mbugu language). Most of the Cushitic groups were assimilated/co-mingled/absorbed, but remnants of those lineages remain amongst the Mbugu people. This has also been established genetically, where gene flow of non-bantu speakers were shown to be partially incorporated into what are now Taita.

The Nilotic influence can be attributed to groups such as the Ngasa that introduced practices of female circumcision in this population. With the Maasai settled in the open plains around much of the area, inevitably a part of the population adopted and assimilated into the Maasai culture to form groups such as the Arusha. This interaction has also resulted in a number of Nilotic lineages in this population, often holding prominent roles due to their warrior status; as evidenced in the names, practices and oral history.

A further insight into this mixed ancestry is in the traditions and distinct phenotypes observed within members of this population.
