= Napuru Waterfalls =

- Napuru Falls
- Napuru Waterfalls
- Location: Near Arusha, Arusha Region, Tanzania

Napuru Waterfalls (also known as Napuru Falls) is a waterfall located near the city of Arusha in northern Tanzania. It lies near the villages of Enaboishu, Olgilai and Nkoaranga.

== Geography ==
A rocky path leading to Napuru Waterfalls

The falls are located about 7 km (4.3 mi) from Arusha. They are reached via Sekei Road, which branches off the Moshi–Arusha highway near Philips Junction. The trail to the falls passes through forest. It crosses the river several times and climbs steep paths. The route offers views of villages, farms and the surroundings of Mount Meru.

A smaller cascade below the main Napuru Waterfalls

== Wildlife ==
The area around the falls is home to wildlife including monkeys and a variety of birds. Vervet monkeys are among the animals commonly seen there.

== Tourism ==
Napuru Waterfalls is a tourist attraction in the Arusha Region and is commonly visited as a day trip from Arusha. Many tours to the falls also include visits to WaArusha villages, birdwatching and local cuisine. The falls are also added as an optional excursion on multi-day northern Tanzania safari itineraries that visit Tarangire, Serengeti or the Ngorongoro Crater.
