= Wadawida =

Ethnic group in southern Kenya

Wadawida, also known as the Taita, are a subgroup of the Taita people of South Eastern Kenya in East Africa. These Bantu-speaking people are in origin and language more related to the Taveta (Tuweta) people of Kenya, and the Pare who live at the Pare Mountains, Chagga who live on the slopes of Kilimanjaro and Sambaa people of Usambara Mountains in Tanzania.

These tribes together with the Waluguru form a group of some closely related in origin; Bantu speaking tribes who occupy the Ancient Eastern Arc Mountains. These are some ancient ranges of Mountains that have now become a very important part of safaris in Tanzania. Many travellers now include hiking tours to these mountains especially in the Tanzania part.

The Wadawida were organized into patrilineal clans known as vichuku. The head of the patrilineal extended family was the legal representative for the family unit.

The Wadawida are believed to have moved into their present Taita Hills as early as the 18th century.
