= Peter Dutkewich =

American freelance photographer

- Dutkewich, c. 1909
- Born: July 18, 1871; Warsaw
- Died: December 9, 1939 (aged 68); Farmingdale, New York
- Other name: Meletius Peter Dutkewich
- Known for: Photography

Meletius Peter Dutkewich (1871–1939) was an American photographer. He was known as an adventurer, big game hunter, and for his attempt to climb Mount Kilimanjaro with Peter MacQueen in 1909.

== Early life ==
Dutkewich was born in Warsaw in 1871 and emigrated to the United States as a teenager. He became a US citizen in 1895.

== Early African travels ==
Between 1908 and 1909, Dutkewich and Peter MacQueen plotted an expedition from the Nile to East Africa and Kilimanjaro, for the purpose of recording their adventures. The excursion was later published in a book titled In Wildest Africa, which contains sixty-four of Dutkewich's photographs along with MacQueen's narrative. The book was published in advance of Theodore Roosevelt's travels to Africa, which heightened American interest in the region.

During their expedition, Dutkewich was reported lost in Central Africa for three weeks, fell into animal traps, and suffered a fall on Kilimanjaro that broke three ribs. They completed their Kilimanjaro ascent on July 17, 1908. Some of Dutkewich's photographs of his African travels – big game hunters, ceremonies and dances, mountain peaks and other African scenes – were published as stereographs by Underwood & Underwood. He was described in 1909 as having "a genius for adventure". Dutkewich was said to have made more than 12,000 negatives of the African continent and his photography was used to illustrate other contemporary books about Africa and appeared in the Burr McIntosh Monthly.

== Later career ==
In the 1920s, Dutkewich met Bert Underwood of Underwood & Underwood while both were traveling in Athens during the Greco-Turkish War. According to his memoir, Underwood offered Dutkewich a job on the spot, but was turned down until Dutkewich fulfilled his ongoing contract with another photographic house. He continued to do freelance work for Underwood & Underwood and other American stereoscopic companies such as B. W. Kilburn & Co., of New York. Over the course of his life, Dutkewich took photographs of many countries and territories, including Australia, New Guinea, New Zealand, Japan, India, China, Siberia, Turkey, the Philippines, the Canadian Rockies, Mexico, Southern Rhodesia, and Kenya.
