= Peter McHarg MacQueen =

Clergyman

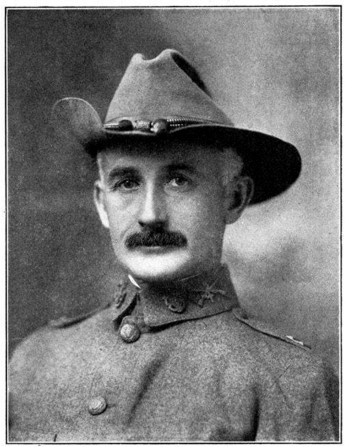
Peter MacQueen, shortly after being appointed chaplain of the 5th Massachusetts Volunteer Infantry

Peter McHarg MacQueen (1863–1924) was an American clergyman, writer, war correspondent, and popular lecturer, best known today for his book In Wildest Africa (1909). In Wildest Africa describes his ascent and retreat from Africa's Mount Kilimanjaro, an account that still informs the mountaineering community.

== Early life and education ==
Born into a workingman's family in Wigtownshire, Scotland on January 11, 1863. MacQueen came to America at age eighteen, determined to acquire a better education than he was likely to receive in Scotland. After working for a year, MacQueen received private financial help to attend Hamilton College in New York, provided he became a clergyman. After a year, he transferred to Princeton University, where he received a BA in 1887 with honors in oratory, essay-writing, and psychology. He received his MA in divinity from Union Theological Seminary in New York City in 1890.

== Early writing ==
Soon after taking up pastoral duties in Bronxville, New York, Peter began writing magazine articles. His first, "The Petroleum Industry," appeared in The Cosmopolitan magazine in November 1892. In 1893, he became pastor of Day Street Congregational Church in the Boston suburb of West Somerville. While reinvigorating that parish with his energy and wit, MacQueen published six more informative articles over the next three years that appeared in Cosmopolitan, Frank Leslie's Popular Monthly, and Munsey's Magazine.

1. 1892 August Bridges and Bridge Builders Cosmopolitan
2. 1892 August Domes, Towers, and Spires Leslie's Monthly
3. 1893 May The Bronx Valley Leslie's Monthly
4. 1893 Oct Perpendicular New York Leslie's Monthly
5. 1893 Feb Life in the Adirondacks Munsey's Magazine
6. 1894 July The Environs of Boston Leslie's Monthly

He subsequently published more than 130 articles in numerous publications.

== War correspondent ==
In 1898, he sailed to Cuba to cover the Spanish–American War as a correspondent for the Boston Evening Transcript, National Magazine (a new Boston-based monthly), and The Congregationalist, a weekly church publication. There he assisted Theodore Roosevelt and the Rough Riders on the front lines such that he was made an honorary member of the regiment. MacQueen's front-line reporting came to earn him the sobriquet "the fighting parson." For the next twenty years, MacQueen continued to write for The Congregationalist and National Magazine, plus Leslie’s Weekly and Boston newspapers such as The Boston Globe. In 1899, granted a leave of absence from his church, he sailed aboard the USAT Grant to the Philippine Islands with General Henry Ware Lawton to cover the Philippine–American War as a "special agent" for President McKinley. The Grant was the first American warship to transit the Suez Canal. In the Philippines, he followed several campaigns with photographer Peter Dutkewich and contributed battlefield accounts for Campaigning in the Philippines, a still-popular account of the war assembled by Karl Irving Faust. On his return to the U.S., MacQueen became embroiled in a nationwide controversy over the conduct of the war stemming from his interview with General Lawton. Next year, MacQueen resigned his church post to continue his avocation as a war correspondent. A strong supporter of Boer independence, he sailed to South Africa to cover the Second Boer War for The Boston Globe and other publications. There, he rode with a company of American volunteers fighting for the Boers.

== World travels ==
Back from the Boer War, he spent the next several years traveling, writing, and lecturing. His travels included a trip to Russia in which he interviewed Leo Tolstoy. He also traveled to the Balkans to write about the Macedonian Struggle He also toured the Middle East. In 1903, he traveled the length of the abandoned Panama Canal project as an agent of now-President Theodore Roosevelt to assess health conditions there. Meantime, he was appointed chaplain of the 5th Massachusetts Volunteer Militia with the rank of captain.

== On the lecture circuit ==
Based on his world travels (which now numbered more than two dozen countries), he developed several illustrated lectures that he delivered to hundreds of audiences in schools, civic facilities, churches, and on the Chautauqua circuit. As an entertaining lecturer, he was said to be one of the sought-after performers on the Chautauqua circuit.

== In Wildest Africa ==
In 1907 he traveled to East Africa with photographer Peter Dutkewich. While en route, MacQueen was inducted in London as a Fellow in the British Royal Geographical Society. During their stay of several months in Africa, he and Dutkewich lived for weeks among the Wataveta tribe in their natural setting, when the two photographed and documented native ceremonies and customs. They then undertook to be the first Americans to reach the summit of Mount Kilimanjaro. They had attained an altitude of 19,200 feet (5,900 m) when a serious injury to Dutkewich forced them to turn back with the loss of life of several porters. On MacQueen's return to the U.S., he wrote In Wildest Africa, profusely illustrated with both his and Dutkewich's photos of native tribes in their natural settings. Later that year, MacQueen was elected as Member of the British Royal Society of Arts. Meantime, he kept up his dealings with President Theodore Roosevelt by briefing him on hunting prospects for the president's forthcoming trip to East Africa.

== Continued travels ==
In 1911, MacQueen traveled the length of Mexico to report on the revolution then roiling that country. In 1913, with the imminent opening of the Panama Canal, Peter made a 16,000-mile (26,000 km) journey to write a series of articles for National Magazine about the soon-more-accessible countries of South America

== World War I, marriage, and the Treaty of Versailles ==
With the outbreak of World War 1 in 1914, he traveled to Belgium and France to cover the early days of the war for Leslie's Weekly and other publications. There, he was arrested as a spy for taking pictures and was threatened with execution, but was able to demonstrate his loyalty to France. Next year, at age 52, he married Blanche Gertrude Lincoln, a childless widow. After having lived in the Boston area for most of his adult life, Peter moved to Boothbay Harbor, Maine, where he had spent many summer vacations. He continued to travel the U.S. delivering lectures from his repertoire of subjects until 1919 when he returned to Europe to cover the Paris talks that resulted in the Treaty of Versailles. He then lectured about the reconstruction of war-ravaged Europe.

== Death ==
Following a brief tenure as pastor of the Boothbay Harbor Congregational church, after delivering an after-dinner speech at Boothbay Harbor, MacQueen died of a heart attack on January 10, 1924. He estimated that in his lifetime, he had traveled 350,000 miles (560,000 km) by steamship and rail and had visited several dozen countries. The Peter MacQueen Papers are held by Boston Public Library, but the whereabouts of his thousands of colored slides from his lectures remain undiscovered.
