= Simeon Laiseri =

Simeon
- Last King of Arusha
- Reign: 1861–1871
- Born: 1888; Arusha
- Died: 1983 (aged 94–95); Arusha
- Burial: Arusha
Names
- Simeon Laiseri Kokan Benne
- Dynasty: Benne
- Religion: Traditional African religions

Simeon Laiseri Kokan Benne (1888–1983), also called "Simeon of Arusha" (Laibon Simeon in Maasai; Mfalme Simoen in Swahili), was a well-known last monarch of the Arusha people. He was born in 1888 in Arusha, Arusha Region, Tanzania. He died in 1983 at the age of 95. He was inaugurated on January 14, 1948, as the first leader of the United Waarusha Community by the British administration's indirect rule policy. He fought against colonialism and is one of the founding fathers of the City of Arusha.

== See also ==
- Mangi Mamkinga
- Mangi Saiye
- Mangi Ngalami
- Mangi Rengua
