= Taveta people =

Ethnic group native to East Africa

Taveta
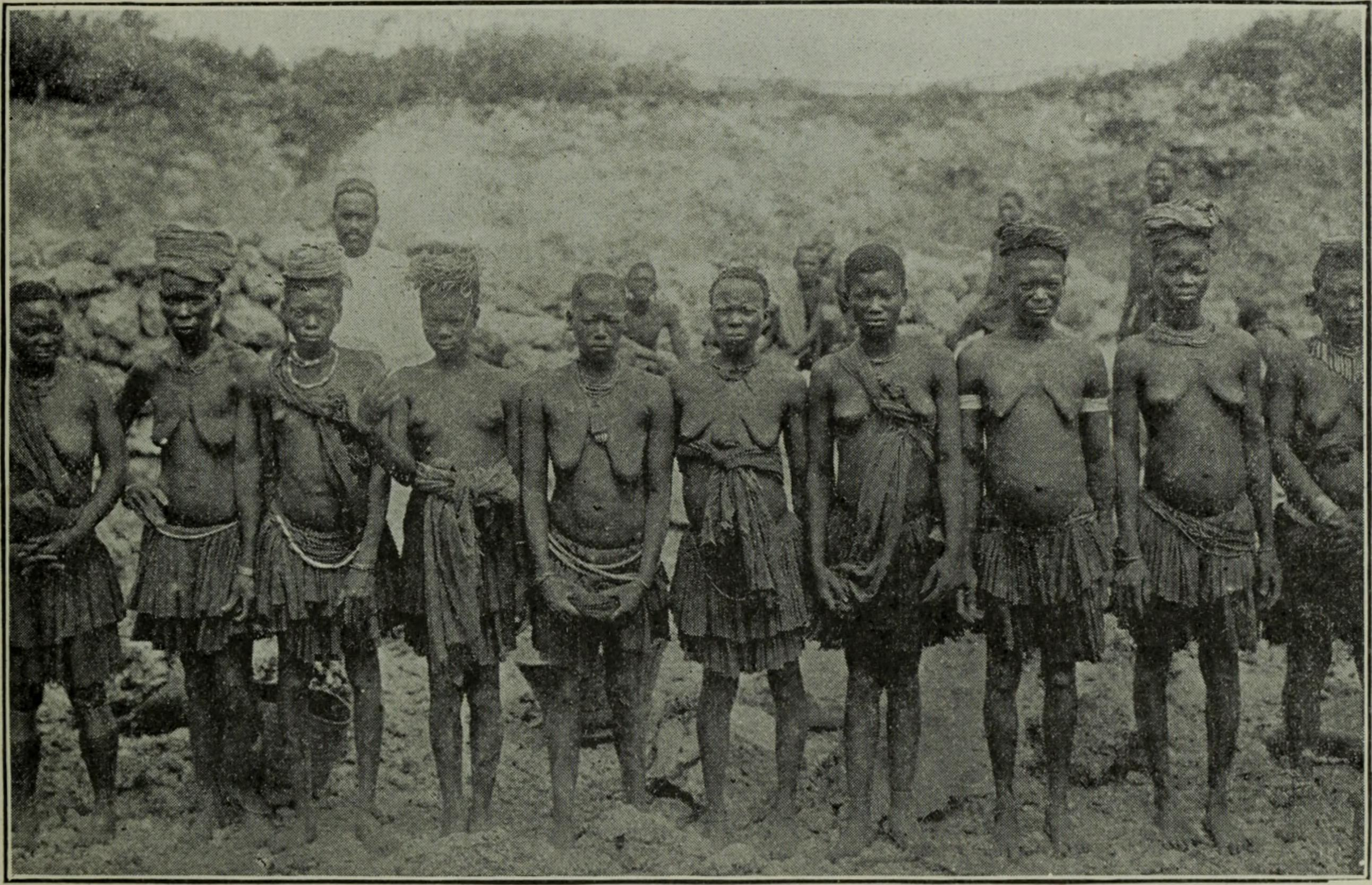
- Wataveta women (published in Western field, 1902)

Total population
- 26,590

Regions with significant populations
- Kenya

Languages
- Taveta

Religion
- African Traditional Religion, Christianity

Related ethnic groups
- People of the Kilimanjaro Corridor

There is also a town in Taita-Taveta District called Taveta

Taveta is the name of a tribe found in Kenya. It is also the name of the principal town in the land of the Taveta people and the name of the surrounding subdistrict of Kenya.

== The people of Taveta ==
The Taveta tribe is one of the Bantu tribes found in Southern Kenya in the Taita Taveta County. The people are sometimes referred to as the 'Wataveta', which is the plural name of the people in their own language, Kitaveta. It has been argued that the Taveta population is commingled with other tribes, notably the Taita, Pare, Chagga, Kamba and Maasai. In addition, the inhabitants reveal migration occurred back and forth throughout the history of these groups, and the Taveta people should be viewed as a part of the bigger population inhabiting the entire Kilimanjaro Corridor. Because of their frequent contact with other tribes, most Tavetans are fluent in (Ki)Swahili as a second language and may also acquire some English or other local languages. The Tavetans are subdivided into five clans, namely Warutu, Wanene, Wazirai, Wasuya, and Wandigiri.

The Wataveta inhabit mainly the lands between Tsavo National Park and the Tanzania border, up to the slopes of Mount Kilimanjaro. Many Tavetans are occupied by commercial and subsistence farming, with the main cash crop being bananas and cotton, sugarcane, exotic and tropical fruits especially mangoes, avocados and many horticultural produce. Some work the local sisal plantations, and a few take advantage of special local commercial activities like transport or cross-border trade.

The Taveta land and people won brief international attention during World War I, when German and British colonial forces clashed there at the slaughter hill "Salaita". Author Isak Dinesen (a.k.a. Karen Blixen) and the film Out of Africa describe this history.

Most Tavetans practice some form of Christianity, roughly thirty percent are affiliated with either the Anglican Church of the Province of Kenya, the Roman Catholic Church, or Pentecostal churches. While Tavetans rarely profess African Traditional Religion, old customs concerning healing or cursing are not unknown.

Taveta is close to the Southeast African coast (Mombasa), and approximately ten percent of Tavetans practice Islam. According to Tavetan lore, the tribe was first exposed to Islam when Arab traders were crossing through their land and were impressed by their conduct leading to mass voluntary conversions. Melekinoi was a great leader among the Taveta.

== Myths of the Taveta ==
The Taveta people believe the banana plant is native to their lands, and traders who passed their lands took them along their travels, distributing the tree around the world. The banana tree emerged from the grounds as a gift from the gods to a daughter of a chief in the Mzirai clan who pleased them and wasn't to be married off to any other clan.

== See also ==
- Peter McHarg MacQueen – an American explorer who spent some time with the tribe in the early 20th century.
