= Taveta language =

Northeast Coast Bantu languages of Kenya

Taveta
- Native to: Kenya
- Ethnicity: Taveta
- Native speakers: 21,000 (2009 census)
- Language family: Niger–Congo?: Atlantic–Congo; Volta-Congo; Benue–Congo; Bantoid; Southern Bantoid; Bantu; Northeast Coast Bantu; Pare-Taveta; Taveta

Language codes
- ISO 639-3: tvs
- Glottolog: tave1240
- Guthrie code: G.21

Taveta or Tubeta is a Northeast Coast Bantu language spoken by the Taveta people of Kenya. It is closely related to Pare (called Chasu by speakers).

Taveta was confused with Dawida by Jouni Maho in his (2009) classification.

TAVETA GREETINGS

HOW TO SAY HELLO/HI IN KITAVETA

Hello/Hi:Jahako

Response:Jedi yoko jahako

Good morning:Washinjiaze

Response:Mboha Yokowe

== Oral literature ==
In 1910 Alfred Claud Hollis published a collection of appx. 100 Taveta proverbs collected from speakers in what was then the southern part of the British East Africa Protectorate. Here are some of those proverbs:

- "Esikie mbeho niye esongeria moto." "It is he who feels cold that approaches the fire (i.e. a person does not do a thing for no reason at all)." (#4)
- "Ukakoma nyoka, mhome na kamwe." "If you kill a snake, kill it entirely." (#6)
- "Ibau liiya na lisiiya, iwiwi ni lisiiya." "Of the hyena that howls and that does not howl, the bad one is the one that does not howl (i.e. it is better to fight a brave and straightforward enemy than one that is cowardly and underhand)." (#8)
- "Ideghe imwe likaremwa kuiya teheshigha kucha." "If one bird ceases singing the dawn will not stop (i.e. the world will not come to an end because one bird ceases singing or because one man dies)." (#10)
- "Iraro la zowu liyaiwa ni suni." "The elephant's bed is slept on by the gazelle (i.e. when a rich man leaves his dwelling as no longer suitable for him, a poor man is only too glad to take up his residence there)." (#14)

In 1911, Hollis also published a collection 66 Taveta riddles.

== Christian literature ==
Items in Taveta were first published by Anglican missionaries. Rev. Albert Remington Steggall worked with a native called Yohana Nene Mdighirri, to translated the Scriptures into Taveta. In 1892 the Gospels of Mark and John were published as Sumu Yedi ya Isa Masiya, hena Marko and Sumu Yedi, yakwe Yohana. They were printed at the Church Mission Society CMS Station. In 1894, the epistles 1-3 John were published. In 1896 The Gospels according to St. Matthew and St. Luke were published by BFBS as Sumu Yedi yakwe Yesu Masihi hena Mattayo and Sumu Yedi yakwe Yesu Masihi (niye Jesus Christ) hena Luka. In 1897 the book of Exodus was published as Kitamo cha keri cha Musa chaitangwa ‘Kufuma’, printed at the Office of the Taveta Chronicle. The bulk of this edition was destroyed by a fire in 1903. In 1900 the Acts of the Apostles were published by the British and Foreign Bible Society, BFBS as Mihiro ya Waondo. Also in 1900 the Epistles of St. James, St. Peter, and St. Jude were published as Mawaraka Mawo Waondo Yakobo, Petro, na Yuda. They were printed at the CMS Taveta Mission Station. In 1903 the Gospel of Mark was revised from the 1892 edition and published by BFBS. In 1894 the Society for Promoting Christian Knowledge published the Book of Common Prayer as Taveta Kitamo cha Kuomba. In 1895 Steggall published, through the SPCK, Hymns in the language of Taveta. In 1905 The Psalms were published by SPCK as Malumbo, hena viteto vya kituweta: (the Psalms, in the language of Taveta), and printed by Richard Clay and Sons of Bungay. There were published by SPCK. In 1906 the Epistles and the Revelation were published as Mawaraka na Ujughuo: hena viteto vya kiyuweta: (the Epistles and the Revelation in Taveta), and these completed the New Testament.
