= Arusha people =

Tanzanian ethnic group

Arusha
Waarusha
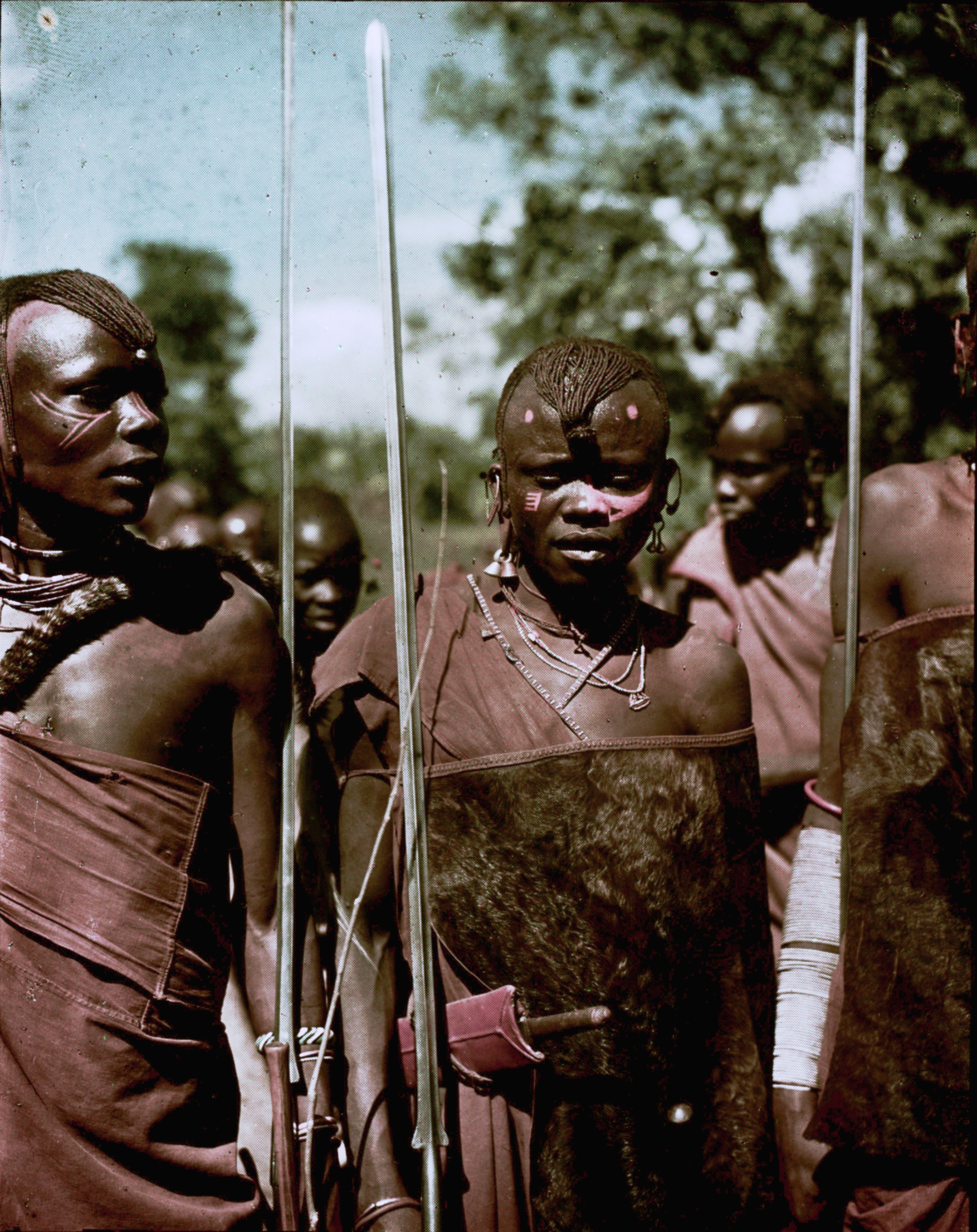
- Arusha dancers in the Tanganyika Territory

Total population
- 63,000 (1978)

Regions with significant populations
- Tanzania Arusha Region (Arusha District)

Languages
- Maa dialect & Swahili

Religion
- African indigenous religion & Christianity

Related ethnic groups
- Maasai, Meru, People of the Kilimanjaro Corridor.

The Arusha (Waarusha, in Swahili) people are a Bantu ethnic and indigenous group based in the western slopes of mount Meru in Arusha District of Arusha Region in Tanzania. The Maasai regard the Arusha people as related as they were once a part of the immigrant Maasai whom arrived in Arusha in the late 18th century from Kenya. The Arusha people are not to be confused by Arusha residents who are a mix of people of different ethnic backgrounds that are born and reside within the borders of the Arusha Region.

== Origins ==
The Arusha people are said to be of Pare origin from the Arusha Chini area of the Kilimanjaro Region. In about 1830 they settled in the Selian area on the southwestern slopes of Mount Meru under Maasai authority. However, the inhabitants reveal migration occurred back and forth throughout the history of this region, and the Arusha people should be viewed as a part of the bigger population inhabiting the entire Kilimanjaro Corridor. The Arusha are distinct from, but related to, the Maasai. They speak the Maasai language, but unlike other Maasai communities, the Arusha people are mostly agriculturalists.

== Late 19th century ==
During the 1880s a series of disasters forced the Arusha further up Mount Meru. Bovine pleuropneumonia and Rinderpest swept the lands, killing many of the Waarusha livestock and the famines and droughts of 1883-6, 1891-2 and 1897-1900 were especially hard on the people, thus weakening them. During the German occupation of Tanganyika, German colonial administrator Kurt Johannes declared war on the Arusha people (who were resistant to the foreign invasion) in 1895. On October 19, 1896, the Arusha retaliated, attacked Johannes, and two German missionaries were killed. In revenge Johannes with the help of the Mangi Rindi of the Chagga kingdom (a former Arusha ally) to the east, Johannes defeated the brave Arusha warriors on October 31, 1886. Johannes then killed many Arusha and Wameru people, confiscated the people's weapons and cattle, burned their home and food reserves to the ground to further weaken them. Three years later in 1899 Kurt Johannes wanted to further humiliate and demoralize the Arusha people. He ordered them to build a fort for him, the fort was to be built in the heart of Waarusha territory. The building was completed in 1901 and marked the end of the Waarusha kingdom. The German fort (boma) was built where the clock tower now stands in the heart of the City of Arusha. .

== 20th century ==
After the defeat and pacification of the Arusha and Meru populations, the Germans confiscated much of the best land from the people and allocated it to a number of German settlers and 100 Afrikaner families from South Africa. During the first world war the British managed to capture Arusha territory in 1916. By 1917 the British expelled the German settlers, confiscating their farms and redistributing them to Greek and British settlers. Under the British controlled Tanganyika territory, through indirect rule the United Waarusha Community was founded and Chief Simeon Laiseri was inaugurated as the new leader of the Waarusha people on January 14, 1948.

The initiation rite(Jando) of both looks similar but they are different, the Waarusha do not accept Masai to participate in initiation rite education, the education involves tricks to win a Masai in normal life, tricks of how to identify the presence of Masai between the Waarusha group. .

The city of Arusha and the Arusha Region was named after The Waarusha people.

== Notable people ==
- Chief Simeon Laiseri

== See also ==
- List of ethnic groups in Tanzania
- Mount Meru
- Arusha Region
- Arumeru District
- Wameru
