= Taita people =

Kenyan ethnic group

Taita
Total population
- 344,415

Regions with significant populations
- Kenya

Languages
- Taita

Religion
- African Traditional Religion, Christianity

Related ethnic groups
- People of the Kilimanjaro Corridor

The Taita people are an ethnic group in Kenya's Taita-Taveta County. They speak Kidawida or Kitaita, which belongs to the Bantu language family. The West-Bantu migrated to the Taita-Taveta County around 1000-1300.

There is debate about whether the Taita people migrated to Kenya through Tanzania. They settled in Kenya in five groups, each occupying different areas in the present-day Taita-Taveta District. During their settlement, the Taita-speaking people interacted with other tribes such as the Taveta, Pare of Tanzania, and Maasai. However, evidence suggests that migration occurred interchangeably throughout the history of these groups, and the Taita people should be considered part of the larger population inhabiting the Kilimanjaro Corridor.

The Taita subgroup or subtribes include the Wadawida, who traditionally lived around Dawida; the Wasagalla, who lived around Saghalla; and the Wakasighau, who lived around the Kasighau massif of the Taita Hills. The Saghalla people speak Kisaghala, which is closely related to Kigiriama or Mijikenda, a language spoken by nine tribes. The Kasighau subgroup is closer to the Pare and Chagga of Tanzania but still speaks Taita.

Traditionally, the Taita tribe consisted of lineages or clans (vichuku, singular kichuku), each occupying a specific territorial area in the hills. These lineages were independent political units, and before colonialism, there was no concept of a unified Taita tribe.

While there were shared cultural traits among the Saghalla, Kasighau, and Dawida, such as "burials" of skulls in caves and rock shelters, there were slight variations. The Dawida only kept the skulls of elderly men above the age of seventy, whereas the Saghala kept skulls of women, children, and men. In some parts of Saghala, they also stored the skulls of members from other communities who died in their territory.

Another tradition among the Taita is the secret cult of the Wabasi. The origins of this tradition are not well-known, but it thrived among the Taita people. The Wabasi were a feared cult group in Taita and had sacred forests and meeting places. If someone joined the Wabasi cult, they could only be buried by another Abasi member.

Mwangeka, Joseph Mwambi a legendary figure for the Taitas, resisted the British colonists from encroaching on the lands of the Wataita.

== Language ==
Today, the Taita language (Kidawida, Kitaita) has evolved into a rich language that incorporates numerous shared words from neighboring communities such as Chagga, Pare, Maasai, Mijikenda, and others with whom the Taita people have coexisted.

The Taita people have various dialects within their community. The Mbololo Taita have their own dialect, while the Bura Taita have another. The Dawidas encompass several dialects, including Wusi, Kidaya, Mghange, Chawia, Mwanda, Kishamba, Werugha, Wumingu, and Wundanyi. Kisaghalla and Kasighau represent relatively independent dialects. When visiting other Taita Massifs, speakers of these dialects would refer to their destination as "going to Dawida."

== Religion ==
Most Taita people are Christians. The traditional religion revolved around the spirit of the ancestors. While Taitas believed in one supreme god, Mlungu, this god was only called upon and given sacrifice for the appeasement or thanksgiving in times of calamities and misfortune. In normal times sacrifices were made to the ancestors or household gods. Only a small number of Taitas still practice the traditional religion

Previously, the Taita Hills held religious significance, featuring prominent rocks (known as "Magamba") and caves called "Mbanga." These sites were considered sacred places for worship and as resting places for the deceased. The caves also provided security and shelter, serving as isolation wards for individuals afflicted with contagious diseases. Patients would be confined to the caves, and food was provided for them. If a patient survived, they were allowed to rejoin the community. Additionally, certain forests held sacred value and were off-limits for other activities, contributing to conservation efforts. These sacred forests, called Fighi, are akin to the Mijikenda's Kaya.

Conversely, the hills and rocks were used for disciplinary purposes and instilling fear. Criminals would be taken to these locations and thrown from the heights to their death. Furthermore, the caves housed dangerous creatures, including large poisonous snakes.

== Marriage ==
Most Taita families traditionally practiced polygamy. Marriages were typically pre-arranged, with the groom being a family friend of the bride's family. The negotiation process (known as "Wupe") involved the bride's father and maternal uncles making important decisions, often focusing on the dowry payment, which typically consisted of livestock. Over time, the dowry would be paid in installments.

When girls reached a suitable age for marriage, a practice known as "kidnapping" would occur. This involved the prospective in-laws "kidnapping" the girls during the evenings when they were out fetching water or firewood.
