= Joseph Merinyo =

Tanzanian political activist and pioneer (1878–1973)

- Born: 1878; Old Moshi, Kilimanjaro, Tanganyika
- Died: 19 April 1973 (aged 94–95); Old Moshi, Kilimanjaro, Tanzania
- Education: Kidia Lutheran Mission
- Spouses: Yohana Masochi (m. 1909) Idda Makei Mandara (m. 1913) Makomu (m. 1915) Ndawonyi (m. 1917)
- Children: 20

Joseph Merinyo (1878 – 19 April 1973), also known as Joseph Merinyo Maro and Joseph Kimaro, was a Tanzanian political activist and pioneer of East African coffee growing. He was a leading figure in the Kilimanjaro Native Planters' Association.
