= Kusini (disambiguation) =

Kusini is a village on the Solomon Islands. Kusini may also refer to

- Kilema Kusini, a town and ward in Tanzania
- Kirua Vunjo Kusini, a town and ward in Tanzania
- Mamba Kusini, a town and ward in Tanzania
- Machame Kusini, a town and ward in Tanzania
- Masama Kusini, a town and ward in Tanzania
- Mwika Kusini, a town and ward in Tanzania
- Uru Kusini, a town and ward in Tanzania
- Countdown at Kusini, a 1976 American action/drama film
