= Kaskazini (disambiguation) =

Kaskazini is Swahili for "North". It is used in:

== Kenya ==
- Kaskazini Mashariki, alternate name for Northeastern Province

== Tanzania ==
=== Kigoma Region ===
- Mwanga Kaskazini, Kigoma-Ujiji District

=== Zanzibar North Region ===
- Kaskazini Unguja, alternate name for Zanzibar North Region
- Kaskazini A, a district
- Kaskazini B, a district

=== Kilimanjaro Region, Tanzania ===
- Mamba Kaskazini, a town and ward in Moshi Rural District
- Mwika Kaskazini, a town and ward in Moshi Rural District
- Siha Kaskazini, a town and ward in Hai District
- Machame Kaskazini, a town and ward in Hai District
- Kilema Kaskazini, a town and ward in Moshi Rural District
- Uru Kaskazini, a town and ward in Moshi Rural District

=== Pemba ===
- Kaskazini Pemba, alternate name for North Pemba Region
