= Mwika Kusini =

Ward in Moshi, Kilimanjaro, Tanzania

Mwika Kusini Kata ya Mwika Kusini
- Ward
- Location within Tanzania
- Coordinates: 3.3489637°S 37.5705515°E
- Country: Tanzania
- Region: Kilimanjaro Region
- District: Moshi Rural
- Ward: Mwika Kusini

Population (2016)
  - Total: 21,070
- Time zone: UTC+3 (EAT)

Mwika Kusini is a town and ward in the Moshi Rural district of the Kilimanjaro Region of Tanzania. Mwika Kusini borders Mwika Kaskazini to the north, Rombo district to the east, Makuyuni to the south and Marangu Mashariki to the west

In 2016 the Tanzania National Bureau of Statistics reported that there were 21,070 people in the ward, down from 19,645 in 2012.

Mwika people (Chaga people) prepare their traditional food that they grow. Banana is a staple that produces dishes such as the favorite machalari. Machalari is prepared with banana and meat. Other traditional food includes kiburu, kitawa, mtori, mlaso, ngararimo, kisusio, kimamtine and others of the like, according to nature of crops and animals on the Chaga land.
