= Mkomongo =

Coordinates: 3.2095633°S 37.2652162°E

Mkomongo Kijiji cha Mkomongo
- Village
- Village of Mkomongo
- Interactive map of Mkomongo
- Country: Tanzania
- Region: Kilimanjaro Region
- District: Moshi District
- Division: Kibosho Division.
- Ward: Kibosho Magharibi
- Settled.: 1800.
- Village Seat: Mangalo.
- Hamlets: List: Karanga.; Makeresho.; Mangalo.; Mawiri.; Mduka Odede.; Mwereni.; Sereni.

Government
  - Type: Local Government Authority (Tanzania)
  - Body: Village Council of Mkomongo.
  - Village Headman: Hon. Ramadhan Mallya.

Population (2012 Census)
  - Total: 3,234
- Time zone: UTC+3 (EAT)
  - Summer (DST): UTC+3 (+3)
- Area code: 25215
- Ethnicity: Kibosho People (Wakibosho).
- Official Languages: Kikibosho, Kiswahili, and English.
- Famous Hamlet: Mduka Odede.
- Local Demonym: Mkomongian.
- National Demonym: Tanzanian.
- Calling Code: +255
- Currency: Tanzanian shilling.

Mkomongo is a Village in the Moshi District, Kilimanjaro Region, the United Republic of Tanzania

== Introduction ==
Mkomongo is a Tanzanian is a Village in the Moshi District, Kilimanjaro Region, the United Republic of Tanzania The village has a population of more than 3,234 in accordance to the National Census of the United Republic of Tanzania which was conducted in 2012.

=== Origin and Formation ===
The Village of Mkomongo was formed in 1800 AD during the rise of Orombo Kingdom on the slopes of Mountain Kilimanjaro. The ancient people of Mkomongo were Bantu people who immigrated to Mkomongo and establish a permanent settlement in the village

=== Ethnicity ===
People of Mkomongo are Chagga by tribe who belong to the chiefdom of Kibosho In a simple way they are called People of Kibosho (Wakibosho).

=== Language ===
People of Mkomongo use their ethnic language of Kikibosho as a medium of communication. Also they often use Kiswahili and English as medium of Communication

== Government ==
=== Village Council of Mkomongo ===
Mkomongo Village is governed by the Village Council in according to the laws of the United Republic of Tanzania

=== Village Headman ===
Mkomongo village is headed by the Village Headman of Mkomongo Village. The Incumbent Village Headman of Mkomongo Village in Hon. Ramadhan Mallya from Chama Cha Demokrasia na Maendeleo.

=== Village Executive Officer ===
Day to a day activities of the Village Council of Mkomongo are executed by the Village Executive Officer in subject to the laws of the United Republic of Tanzania.

=== Hamlets ===
Mkomongo Village has the following Hamlets;-

- Karanga
- Makeresho
- Mangalo
- Mawiri
- Mduka Odede
- Mwereni
- Sereni

== Weather ==
Mkomongo Village is located at an elevation of 1,207 meters above sea level. Its coordinates are 3°15'0" S and 37°19'0" E in DMS (Degrees Minutes Seconds) or -3.25 and 37.3167 (in decimal degrees). Its UTM position is CS14 and its Joint Operation Graphics reference is SA37-13. The sun rises at 07:52 and sets at 20:00 local time (Africa/Dar_es_Salaam UTC/GMT+3). The standard time zone for Kibosho is UTC/GMT+3 In 2015 DST starts on - and ends on.

Climate data for Mkomongo
Month	Jan	Feb	Mar	Apr	May	Jun	Jul	Aug	Sep	Oct	Nov	Dec	Year
Mean daily maximum °C (°F)	33 (91)	33 (91)	32 (90)	29 (84)	26 (79)	25 (77)	25 (77)	26 (79)	28 (82)	31 (88)	31 (88)	32 (90)	29 (85)
Mean daily minimum °C (°F)	17 (63)	17 (63)	18 (64)	19 (66)	18 (64)	16 (61)	15 (59)	15 (59)	15 (59)	16 (61)	17 (63)	17 (63)	17 (62)
Average precipitation mm (inches)	30 (1.2)	50 (2.0)	110 (4.3)	350 (13.8)	230 (9.1)	30 (1.2)	20 (0.8)	10 (0.4)	10 (0.4)	20 (0.8)	60 (2.4)	50 (2.0)	970 (38.4)
Source: Weatherbase

== Means of Transport ==
Means of Transport used by people of Mkomongo Village are Cars, Helicopters, Bodaboda and feet.

== Economic Activities ==
Dominant economic activities in Mkomongo Village are Agriculture, Bee Keeping, Livestock Keeping, and entrepreneurial activities. People of Mkomongo are working in both public and private sectors.

== Tourism ==
Mount Kilimanjaro is visible at Mkomongo village. Also there are Somsom River, Sere River, and Karanga River which are one among the attracting tourist sites within the Village.

== Education ==
The Village has one Primary School which is known as Mkomongo Primary School and that; It is among the village owners of Somsom Secondary School, and Kibosho Vocational Training Centre.

== Health Services ==
People of Mkomongo Village get the health services at Umbwe Health Centre and Umbwe Parish Dispensary and where necessary Kibosho District Hospital as the case may be the Kilimanjaro Mawenzi Regional Hospital and Kilimanjaro Christian Medical Centre.

== Traditions and Customs ==
=== Mbasa Songs ===
People of Mkomongo Village use to sing their traditional songs which are called Mbasa. The Songs are normally used to be sung in ceremonies and social gatherings for the purpose of uniting people and stabilizing socialization among the people of Mkomongo Village.

=== Mbege (Mkomongian Beer) ===
Most of people in Mkomongo drink a traditional Mkomongian Beer which is popularly known as "Mbege".

== Religion ==
Most of people in Mkomongo Village are believers of the Roman Catholic Church.
The following is a summary of believers of different religions in Mkomongo Village;-
1. Roman Catholic Church = 98%
2. Other Religions = 01%
3. Non Believers(Pagans) = 01%

== Water ==
Mkomongo Village has different natural springs which are traditional known as "Mbora". Also the Village is getting the water services from Lyamungo - Umbwe Water Supply Authority

== Electricity ==
In Mkomongo Village there is availability of Electricity Service which is maintained by Tanzania Electric Supply Company Limited
