= Nasai (ward) =

Ward in Siha District, Kilimanjaro Region

Nasai Ward Kata ya Nasai (Swahili)
- Ward
- Kata ya Nasai, Wilaya ya Siha
- Location within Tanzania
- Country: Tanzania
- Region: Kilimanjaro Region
- District: Siha District

Area
  - Total: 10.8 km^{2} (4.2 sq mi)
- Elevation: 1,377 m (4,518 ft)

Population (2012)
  - Total: 8,032
  - Density: 744/km^{2} (1,930/sq mi)

Nasai is an administrative ward in Siha District of Kilimanjaro Region in Tanzania. The ward covers an area of 10.8 km^{2} (4.2 sq mi), and has an average elevation of 1,377 m (4,518 ft). According to the 2012 census, the ward has a total population of 8,032.
