= Ndumeti =

Ward in Siha District, Kilimanjaro Region

Ndumeti Ward Kata ya Ndumeti (Swahili)
- Ward
- Kata ya Ndumeti, Wilaya ya Siha
- Location within Tanzania
- Country: Tanzania
- Region: Kilimanjaro Region
- District: Siha District

Area
  - Total: 560 km^{2} (220 sq mi)
- Elevation: 1,297 m (4,255 ft)

Population (2012)
  - Total: 11,344
  - Density: 20/km^{2} (52/sq mi)

Ndumeti is an administrative ward in Siha District of Kilimanjaro Region in Tanzania. The ward covers an area of 560 km^{2} (220 sq mi), and has an average elevation of 1,297 m (4,255 ft). According to the 2012 census, the ward has a total population of 11,344.
