= Biriri =

Ward in Siha District, Kilimanjaro Region

Biriri Ward Kata ya Biriri (Swahili)
- Ward
- Kata ya Biriri, Wilaya ya Siha
- Location within Tanzania
- Country: Tanzania
- Region: Kilimanjaro Region
- District: Siha District

Area
  - Total: 38.95 km^{2} (15.04 sq mi)
- Elevation: 1,305 m (4,281 ft)

Population (2012)
  - Total: 7,768
  - Density: 199.4/km^{2} (516.5/sq mi)

Biriri is an administrative ward in Siha District of Kilimanjaro Region in Tanzania. The ward covers an area of 38.95 km^{2} (15.04 sq mi), and has an average elevation of 1,305 m (4,281 ft). According to the 2012 census, the ward has a total population of 7,768.
