= Uru Shimbwe =

Ward in Moshi, Kilimanjaro, Tanzania

Uru Shimbwe Kata ya Uru Shimbwe
- Ward
- Location within Tanzania
- Coordinates: 3.2598395°S 37.377217°E
- Country: Tanzania
- Region: Kilimanjaro Region
- District: Moshi Rural
- Ward: Uru Shimbwe

Population (2016)
  - Total: 6,550
- Time zone: UTC+3 (EAT)

Uru Shimbwe is a town and ward in the Moshi Rural district of the Kilimanjaro Region of Tanzania. In 2016 the Tanzania National Bureau of Statistics report there were 6,550 people in the ward, from 6,107 in 2012.
