= Materuni =

Village in Tanzania

Materuni is a village located in the Kilimanjaro region in Tanzania. The village is inhabited by the Chagga people. It is famous for the Materuni Waterfalls.
