= Kirua Vunjo Magharibi =

- Town and ward
- Interactive map of Kirua Vunjo Magharibi
- Coordinates: 3.325259°S 37.432119°E
- Country: Tanzania
- Region: Kilimanjaro Region
- District: Moshi Rural

Population (2012)
  - Total: 12,840
- Time zone: UTC+3 (EAT)

Kirua Vunjo Magharibi is a town and ward in the Moshi Rural district of Kilimanjaro Region, Tanzania. Its population according to the 2012 census was 12,840.
