= Marangu Magharibi =

Ward in Moshi, Kilimanjaro, Tanzania

Marangu Magharibi Kata ya Marangu Magharibi
- Ward
- Location within Tanzania
- Coordinates: 3.27946219°S 37.49952512°E
- Country: Tanzania
- Region: Kilimanjaro Region
- District: Moshi Rural
- Ward: Marangu Magharibi

Population (2016)
  - Total: 20,352
- Time zone: UTC+3 (EAT)

Marangu Magharibi is a town and ward in the Moshi Rural district of the Kilimanjaro Region of Tanzania. In 2016, the Tanzania National Bureau of Statistics reported a population of 20,352 people, up from 18,976 in 2012.
