= Hai Mjini =

Ward in Hai District, Kilimanjaro Region

Hai Mjini Ward Kata ya Hai Mjini (Swahili)
- Ward
- Kata ya Hai Mjini, Wilaya ya Hai
- Location within Tanzania
- Country: Tanzania
- Region: Kilimanjaro Region
- District: Hai District

Area
  - Total: 54 km^{2} (21 sq mi)
- Elevation: 1,388 m (4,554 ft)

Population (2012)
  - Total: 34,098
  - Density: 630/km^{2} (1,600/sq mi)

Hai Mjini is an administrative ward in Hai District of Kilimanjaro Region in Tanzania. The ward covers an area of 54 km^{2} (21 sq mi), and has an average elevation of 1,388 m (4,554 ft). According to the 2012 census, the ward has a total population of 34,098.

The ward contains the rapidly growing town of Boma Ng'ombe (alternately spelled as "Bomang'ombe" ) meaning a bovine palisade. The population of Boma Ng'ombe, based on the 2002 Tanzanian census, was 17,674. Geographically, Boma Ng'ombe is located between the Sanya River and the Mungushi gulch and straddles the Arusha-Himo road about 17 kilometers from the Kilimanjaro International Airport. The headquarters of the Hai District is just to the north of that road. The town has a public market open twice per week. There are numerous schools in Boma Ng'ombe; however, the only A-Level school within the ward as of 2012 was Isala High School.
