= Karansi =

Ward in Siha District, Kilimanjaro Region

Karansi Ward Kata ya Karansi (Swahili)
- Ward
- Kata ya Karansi, Wilaya ya Siha
- Location within Tanzania
- Country: Tanzania
- Region: Kilimanjaro Region
- District: Siha District

Area
  - Total: 58.5 km^{2} (22.6 sq mi)
- Elevation: 1,398 m (4,587 ft)

Population (2012)
  - Total: 11,394
  - Density: 195/km^{2} (504/sq mi)

Karansi is an administrative ward in Siha District of Kilimanjaro Region in Tanzania. The ward covers an area of 58.5 km^{2} (22.6 sq mi), and has an average elevation of 1,398 m (4,587 ft). According to the 2012 census, the ward has a total population of 11,394.
