= Kahe Mashariki =

Ward in Moshi, Kilimanjaro, Tanzania

Kahe Mashariki Kata ya Kahe Mashariki
- Ward
- Location within Tanzania
- Coordinates: 3.4719123°S 37.516016°E
- Country: Tanzania
- Region: Kilimanjaro Region
- District: Moshi Rural
- Ward: Kahe Mashariki

Population (2016)
  - Total: 12,210
- Time zone: UTC+3 (EAT)

Kahe Mashariki is a town and ward in the Moshi Rural district of the Kilimanjaro Region of Tanzania. In 2016 the Tanzania National Bureau of Statistics report there were 12,210 people in the ward, from 11,384 in 2012.
