= Arusha Chini =

Coordinates: 3°35′S 37°20′E

- Town and ward
- Interactive map of Arusha Chini
- Country: Tanzania
- Region: Kilimanjaro Region
- District: Moshi Rural

Population (2012)
  - Total: 13,960
- Time zone: UTC+3 (EAT)

Arusha Chini is a town and ward in the Moshi Rural district of the Kilimanjaro Region of Tanzania. Its population according to the 2012 census was 13,960.
