= Machame Magharibi =

Ward in Hai District, Kilimanjaro Region

Machame Magharibi Ward Kata ya Machame Magharibi (Swahili)
- Ward
- Kata ya Machame Magharibi, Wilaya ya Hai
- Location within Tanzania
- Country: Tanzania
- Region: Kilimanjaro Region
- District: Hai District

Area
  - Total: 99 km^{2} (38 sq mi)
- Elevation: 2,724 m (8,937 ft)

Population (2012)
  - Total: 6,503
  - Density: 66/km^{2} (170/sq mi)

Machame Kusini is an administrative ward in Hai District of Kilimanjaro Region in Tanzania. The ward covers an area of 99 km^{2} (38 sq mi), and has an average elevation of 2,724 m (8,937 ft). According to the 2012 census, the ward has a total population of 13,572.
