= Masama Mashariki =

Ward in Hai District, Kilimanjaro Region

Masama Mashariki Ward Kata ya Masama Mashariki (Swahili)
- Ward
- Kata ya Masama Mashariki, Wilaya ya Hai
- Location within Tanzania
- Country: Tanzania
- Region: Kilimanjaro Region
- District: Hai District

Area
  - Total: 82.6 km^{2} (31.9 sq mi)
- Elevation: 1,255 m (4,117 ft)

Population (2012)
  - Total: 25,723
  - Density: 311/km^{2} (807/sq mi)

Masama Mashariki (East Masama in English) is an administrative ward in Hai District of Kilimanjaro Region in Tanzania. The ward covers an area of 82.6 km^{2} (31.9 sq mi), and has an average elevation of 1,255 m (4,117 ft). According to the 2012 census, the ward has a total population of 25,723.
