= Materuni Waterfalls =

Waterfall in Tanzania

Coordinates: 3.25000°S 37.40025°E

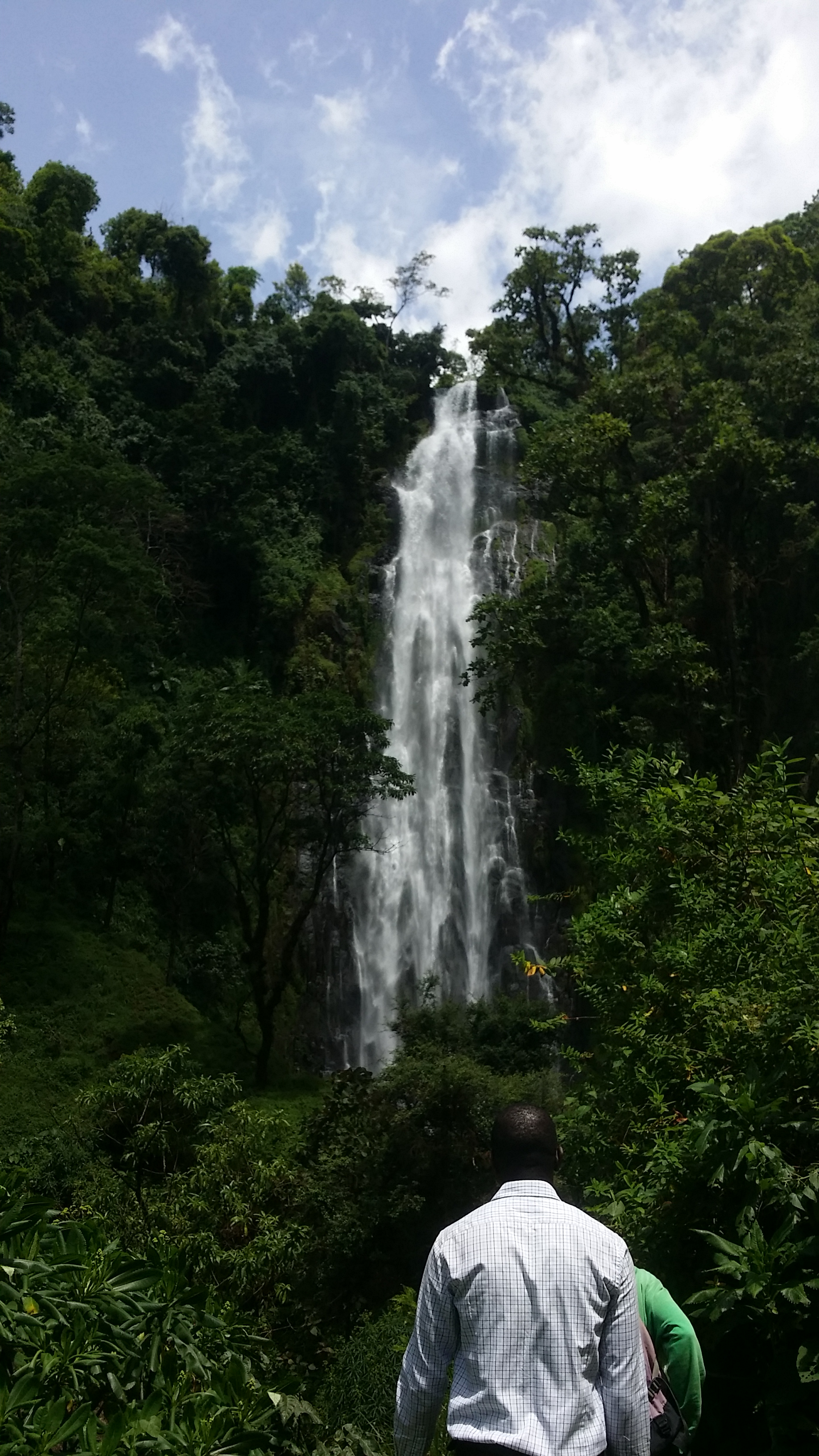
Materuni Waterfalls

Materuni Waterfall, at an elevation of 1,540 m above sea level is one of the Waterfalls in the Mware River (Kilimanjaro Region, North East Tanzania). It is found in the village of Materuni on the edge of the Kilimanjaro mountain reserve.

== See also ==
- List of waterfalls
