= Okaoni =

Ward in Moshi, Kilimanjaro, Tanzania

Okaoni Kata ya Okaoni
- Ward
- Location within Tanzania
- Coordinates: 3.2184612°S 37.2926481°E
- Country: Tanzania
- Region: Kilimanjaro Region
- District: Moshi Rural
- Ward: Okaoni

Population (2016)
  - Total: 11,204
- Time zone: UTC+3 (EAT)

Okaoni is a town and ward in the Moshi Rural district of the Kilimanjaro Region of Tanzania. In 2016 the Tanzania National Bureau of Statistics report there were 11,204 people in the ward, from 10,446 in 2012.
