= Ngarenairobi =

Ward in Siha District, Kilimanjaro Region

Ngarenairobi Ward Kata ya Ngarenairobi (Swahili)
- Ward
- Kata ya Ngarenairobi, Wilaya ya Siha
- Location within Tanzania
- Country: Tanzania
- Region: Kilimanjaro Region
- District: Siha District

Area
  - Total: 172.4 km^{2} (66.6 sq mi)
- Elevation: 2,111 m (6,926 ft)

Population (2012)
  - Total: 9,431
  - Density: 54.70/km^{2} (141.7/sq mi)

Ngarenairobi is an administrative ward in Siha District of Kilimanjaro Region in Tanzania. The ward covers an area of 172 km^{2} (66 sq mi), and has an average elevation of 2,111 m (6,926 ft). According to the 2012 census, the ward has a total population of 9,431.
