= Old Moshi Mashariki =

Ward in Moshi, Kilimanjaro, Tanzania

Old Moshi Mashariki Kata ya Old Moshi Mashariki
- Ward
- Location within Tanzania
- Coordinates: 3.30779928°S 37.4054276°E
- Country: Tanzania
- Region: Kilimanjaro Region
- District: Moshi Rural
- Ward: Old Moshi Mashariki

Population (2016)
  - Total: 10,219
- Time zone: UTC+3 (EAT)

Old Moshi Mashariki is a town and ward in the Moshi Rural district of the Kilimanjaro Region of Tanzania. In 2016 the Tanzania National Bureau of Statistics report there were 10,219 people in the ward, from 9,528 in 2012.
