= Makiwaru =

Ward in Siha District, Kilimanjaro Region

Makiwaru Ward Kata ya Makiwaru (Swahili)
- Ward
- Kata ya Makiwaru, Wilaya ya Siha
- Location within Tanzania
- Country: Tanzania
- Region: Kilimanjaro Region
- District: Siha District

Area
  - Total: 37.9 km^{2} (14.6 sq mi)
- Elevation: 1,238 m (4,062 ft)

Population (2012)
  - Total: 10,699
  - Density: 282/km^{2} (731/sq mi)

Makiwaru is an administrative ward in Siha District of Kilimanjaro Region in Tanzania. The ward covers an area of 37.9 km^{2} (14.6 sq mi), and has an average elevation of 1,238 m (4,062 ft). According to the 2012 census, the ward has a total population of 10,699.
