= Kirima (disambiguation) =

Kirima may refer to:

== Place names ==
- Quirima (or Kirima), a town and municipality in the province of Malanje (Malange), in Angola
- Kirima, a town and ward in the Moshi Rural district of the Kilimanjaro Region, in Tanzania

== Surname ==
- Gerishon Kirima, Kenyan real estate investor and former Member of Parliament
- Muthoni Kirima (1931–2023), female fighter in Mau Mau's 1950s rebellion against British colonialism
- Nicodemus Kirima (1936–2007), Kenyan Roman Catholic prelate
