= East African Mounted Rifles =

British regiment in East Africa

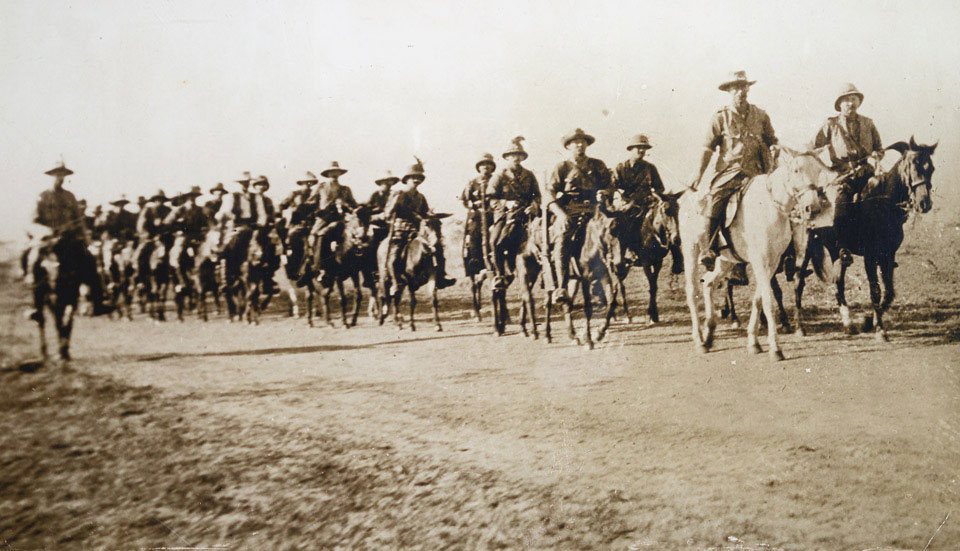
- Members of the unit, 1915
- Active: 1914–1917
- Country: Colony of Kenya
- Allegiance: British Empire
- Type: Mounted infantry
- Size: c. 400 men
- Engagements: First World War; East African campaign

The East African Mounted Rifles was a regiment of mounted infantry raised in the British Colony of Kenya for service in the East African Campaign of the First World War. Formed at the start of the war from volunteers, it was entirely white and drawn primarily from Boer settlers and members of the Legion of Frontiersmen. With horses in short supply, some men were mounted on polo ponies or mules.

The East African Mounted Rifles, around 400 strong, deployed to support the recapture of Kisii, Kenya, in September 1914. They also served in an attack on Longido in German Tanganyika in November. Further action on the frontier followed until April 1915, when the unit was posted on guard duty on the Uganda Railway. The East African Mounted Rifles was a good source of leaders for other units, such as the King's African Rifles. Detachments of men for this purpose and the return of volunteers to their farms depleted the force. It served on a small scale in actions in 1915 and 1916 but mustered just four men by the end of 1916. It was still extant, with three men, in May 1917, but is afterwards described as having "faded away". Veterans' reunions were held post-war, and the East African Reconnaissance Squadron in the Second World War is regarded as a successor unit.

== Formation ==
Kenya was a British East African colony bordering German East Africa to the south. Tensions in Europe had been rising following the assassination of Archduke Franz Ferdinand and the July Crisis. Lieutenant Colonel Launcelot Ward, recently retired and headed for England, was recalled to the colony to assume command of British East African forces. He oversaw the creation of self-defence forces to supplement the relatively small British garrison, primarily consisting of elements of the King's African Rifles.

Britain declared war on Germany on the night of 4/5 August 1914, following the German invasion of neutral Belgium. The following morning a recruitment office opened for self-defence forces in Nairobi, the capital of the Colony of Kenya. Several small units were formed, including the Plateau South Africans, Arnoldi's Scouts, Wessel's Scouts and William Bowker's Bowker's Horse. These were amalgamated to form the East African Mounted Rifles. A small infantry unit, the East African Regiment, was also established but was soon broken up to provide men for other units.

The East African Mounted Rifles was envisaged as a regiment-sized mobile unit intended to strike against German forces threatening to invade from Tanganyika. It was intended to be formed of six mounted infantry squadrons, a Maxim gun section and a unit of signallers.

The unit welcomed any white volunteer who could ride a horse and carry a rifle. It was formed primarily from Boer settlers and members of the civilian Legion of Frontiersmen. Some of the men had prior experience with the British forces in India or during the Second Boer War and many were big game hunters. A number of experienced men served in leadership roles, including as commanding officer, second-in-command, adjutant, regimental sergeant major and as quartermasters. A unit of scouts, formed under the command of Frank O'Brien Wilson as the Magadi Defence Force, was integrated into the unit. Bertram Gurdon, 2nd Baron Cranworth, with prior service in the Norfolk Artillery, served as a lieutenant.

There were initially no uniforms available so volunteers wore their own shirts, onto the shoulders of which local women sewed the initials "EAMR" and, sometimes, the initials of the preceding units. A standardised uniform was eventually made available in July 1915, though even then many members preferred not to wear it. Sometimes the horses of the regiment were camouflaged as zebras, with stripes being painted on in iodine.

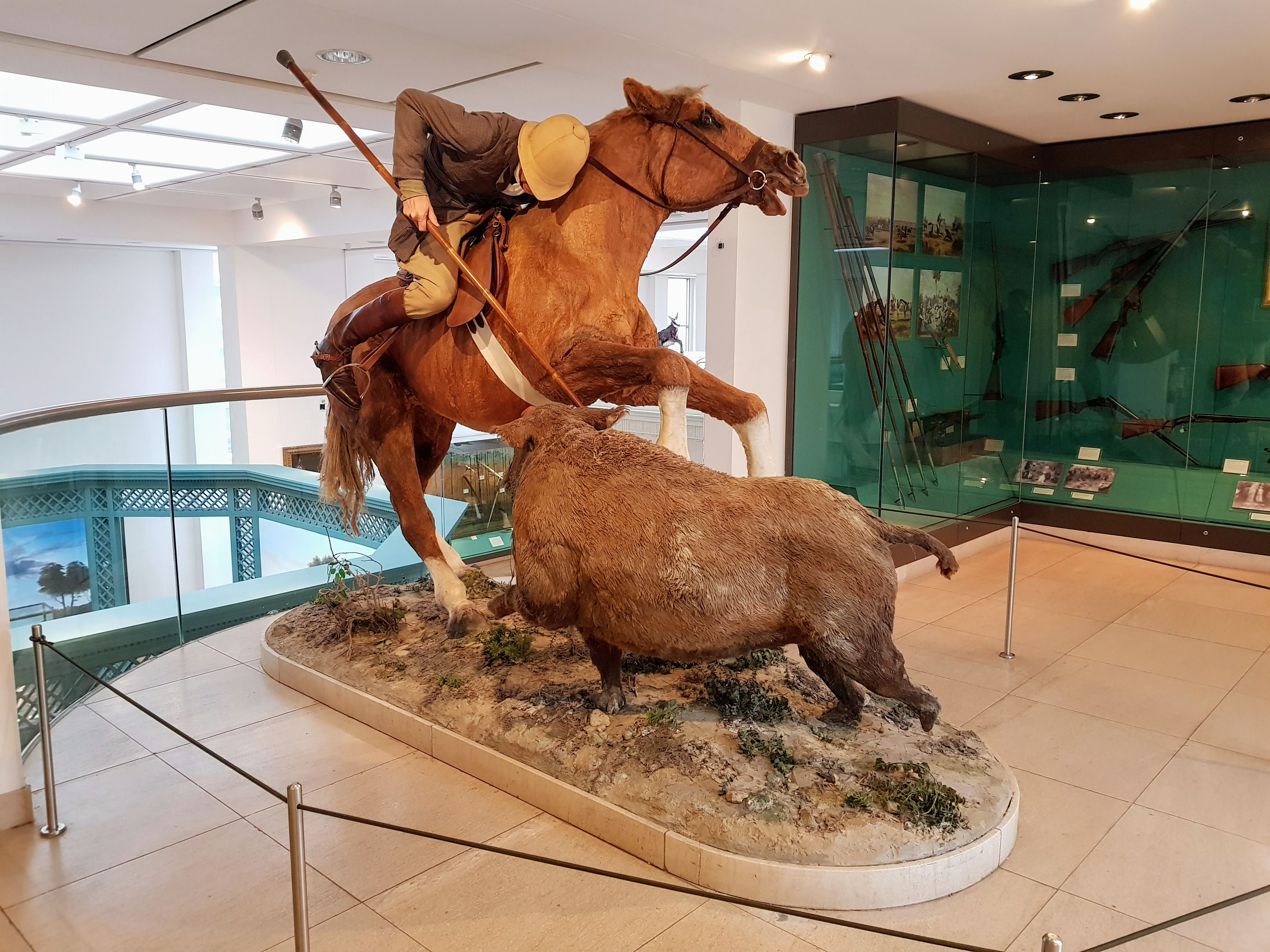
A depiction of a pig-sticking spear in action

The East African Mounted Rifles were initially armed with breech-loading rifles supplied by the colonial government. An intervention by Boer War veteran Davies Evans led to issuing of more modern magazine-fed rifles. The unit was also issued with pigsticking spears, but these were soon withdrawn after several near-fatal accidents. Horses were commandeered from local farms, but insufficient were available, and some of the men were mounted on polo ponies or mules.

The East African Mounted Rifles trained in Nairobi. Their drills were often watched by the daughter of the governor Henry Conway Belfield, and the unit came to be known after her as "Monica's Own". By the end of August 1914 the unit reached 400 men in size but many of its men were taken to provide officers and non-commissioned officers to the King's African Rifles and other units.

== Early actions ==
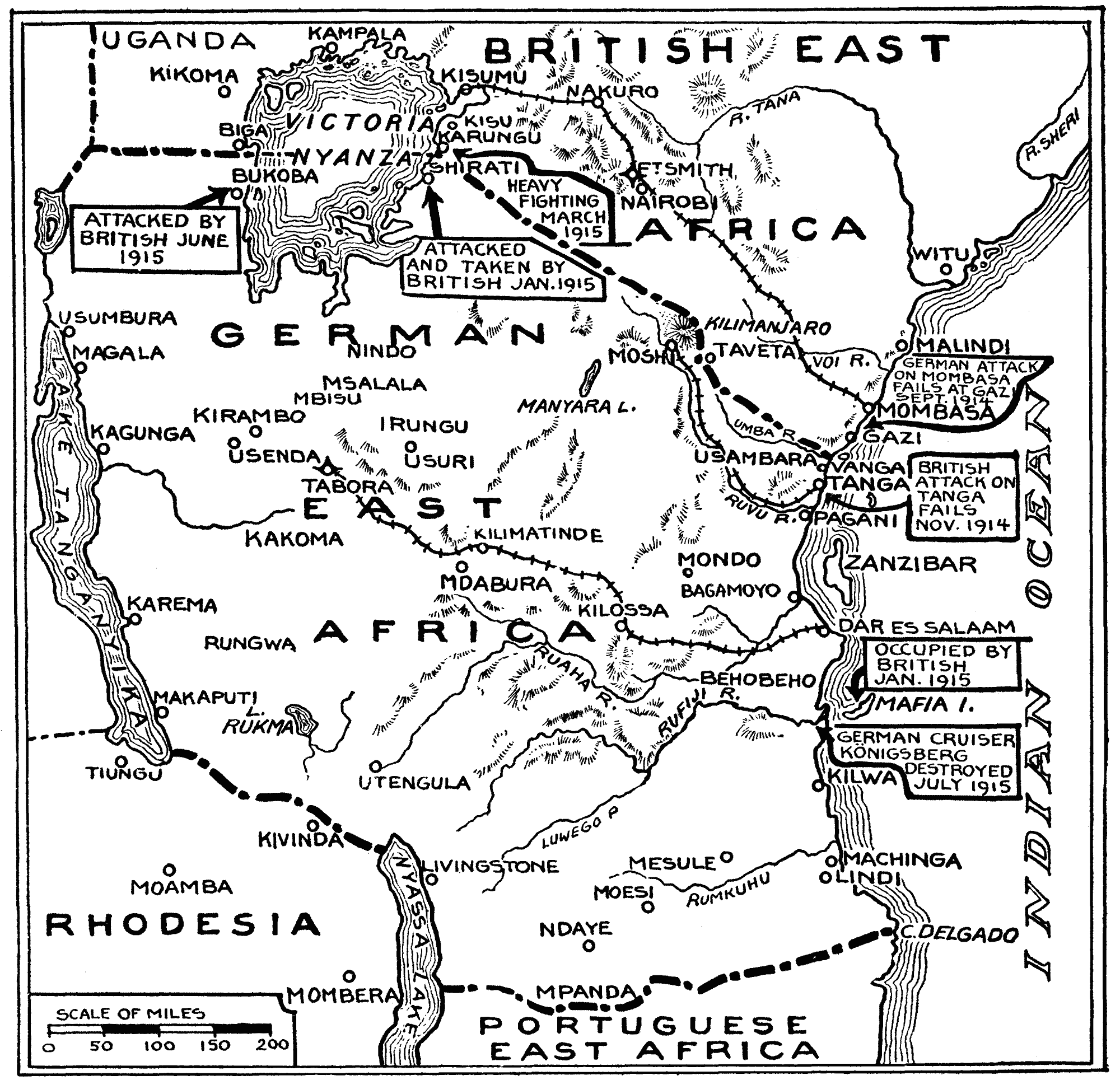
Early actions of the East Africa Campaign

The East African Mounted Rifles were first deployed in an attack on German forces that had occupied the Kenyan village of Kisii. The principal attack came from the 4th battalion of the King's African Rifles and the East African Mounted Rifles was to support on the flank. The unit travelled by rail from Nairobi to Kisumu and embarked on boats on Lake Victoria. The men landed at Karungu but came under attack and withdrew into reeds. They reached Kisii on 12 September, by which time the King's African Rifles had already taken the village following the German retreat after an inconclusive engagement. The East African Mounted Rifles then returned to Nairobi.

On 3 November 1914, 360 men of the East African Mounted Rifles supported an attack by Indian troops on the Tanganyikan town of Longido, successfully capturing the settlement. In March 1915 a detachment of the regiment was formed into a mobile reserve on the Kenya-Tanganyika frontier. On 9 March the unit was the first to spot and engage a German column under Lieutenant von Haxthausen. The Germans were eventually driven from a ridge and retreated across the Mara River. The unit also participated in the attack on Gararagua, Tanganyika, later that month.

The East African Mounted Rifles proved effective in the campaign. Treating the war "as if it were another safari", their use of civilian camp followers and practice of providing their own supplies led to notably lower rates of dysentery than other units. While their initial service on the frontier was valuable, it was decided that the unit was more useful as a source of leaders for the King's African Rifles. It was afterwards used to guard the Uganda Railway. Between 12 April 1915 and 10 May 1916 German forces made 57 attempts to mine the railway but many were thwarted by the unit's patrols.

== Fading away ==
By early 1915 volunteers began to drift away from the unit back to their farms. A squadron of the East African Mounted Rifles was part of a force sent to recapture Longido in September 1915. The squadron formed a firing line on a ridge overlooking the German position. The unit suffered losses of two killed, one wounded and four missing and were given permission to withdraw. The attack was unsuccessful, but the missing men were recovered by a party of the King's African Rifles. A dozen men of the East African Mounted Rifles served in the August 1916 advance on the German Tanganyika Railway. By the end of 1916 it mustered only its commander, Major Clifford Hill, a sergeant and two troopers. By May 1917 it was just Hill, the sergeant and a trooper; the unit is described as having then "faded away".

The unit left behind few records, but a regimental history was written by its medical officer Dr C. J. Wilson, in 1938. It is listed on the Cavalry of the Empire Memorial in Hyde Park, London.

Annual regimental reunions were held jointly with the Kenyan Ex-War Service Federation after the war. These were started, at least partly, to provide a nucleus for any future defence force. The East African Reconnaissance Squadron, formed in the Second World War, is regarded as a successor to the regiment. Surviving veterans of the East African Mounted Rifles were honoured with a pageant in 1960.
