= Uru Mashariki =

Ward in Moshi, Kilimanjaro, Tanzania

Uru Mashariki Kata ya Uru Mashariki
- Ward
- Location within Tanzania
- Coordinates: 3.2912787°S 37.3657159°E
- Country: Tanzania
- Region: Kilimanjaro Region
- District: Moshi Rural
- Ward: Uru Mashariki

Population (2016)
  - Total: 15,853
- Time zone: UTC+3 (EAT)

Uru Mashariki is a town and ward in the Moshi Rural district of the Kilimanjaro Region of Tanzania. In 2016 the Tanzania National Bureau of Statistics report there were 15,853 people in the ward, from 14,781 in 2012.
