= Mbokomu =

Ward in Moshi, Kilimanjaro, Tanzania

Mbokomu Kata ya Mbokomu
- Ward
- Location within Tanzania
- Coordinates: 3°16′45″S 37°24′08″E
- Country: Tanzania
- Region: Kilimanjaro Region
- District: Moshi Rural
- Ward: Mbokomu

Population (2016)
  - Total: 15,665
- Time zone: UTC+3 (EAT)

Mbokomu is a town and ward in the Moshi Rural district of the Kilimanjaro Region of Tanzania. In 2016 the Tanzania National Bureau of Statistics report there were 15,665 people in the ward, from 14,606 in 2012.
