= Sanya Juu =

Ward in Siha District, Kilimanjaro Region

Sanya Juu Ward Kata ya Sanya Juu (Swahili)
- Ward
- Kata ya Sanya Juu, Wilaya ya Siha
- Location within Tanzania
- Country: Tanzania
- Region: Kilimanjaro Region
- District: Siha District

Area
  - Total: 21 km^{2} (8.1 sq mi)
- Elevation: 1,340 m (4,400 ft)

Population (2012)
  - Total: 11,283
  - Density: 540/km^{2} (1,400/sq mi)

Sanya Juu is an administrative ward in Siha District of Kilimanjaro Region in Tanzania. The ward covers an area of 21 km^{2} (8.1 sq mi), and has an average elevation of 1,340 m (4,400 ft). According to the 2012 census, the ward has a total population of 11,283.
