= Machame Kusini =

Ward in Hai District, Kilimanjaro Region

Machame Kusini Ward Kata ya Machame Kusini (Swahili)
- Ward
- Kata ya Machame Kusuni, Wilaya ya Hai
- Location within Tanzania
- Country: Tanzania
- Region: Kilimanjaro Region
- District: Hai District

Area
  - Total: 80.5 km^{2} (31.1 sq mi)
- Elevation: 914 m (2,999 ft)

Population (2012)
  - Total: 13,572
  - Density: 169/km^{2} (437/sq mi)

Machame Kusini is an administrative ward in Hai District of Kilimanjaro Region in Tanzania. The ward covers an area of 80.5 km^{2} (31.1 sq mi), and has an average elevation of 914 m (2,999 ft). According to the 2012 census, the ward has a total population of 13,572.
