= Kilema Kati =

Kibosho Kati
- Town and ward
- Location in Tanzania
- Coordinates: 3.294916955°S 37.4942337°E
- Country: Tanzania
- Region: Kilimanjaro Region
- District: Moshi Rural

Population (2012)
  - Total: 6,993
- Time zone: UTC+3 (EAT)

Kilema Kati is a town and ward in the Moshi Rural district of the Kilimanjaro Region of Tanzania. Its population according to the 2012 census was 6,993.
