= Masama Magharibi =

Ward in Hai District, Kilimanjaro Region, Tanzania

Masama Magharibi Ward Kata ya Masama Mgaharibi (Swahili)
- Ward
- Kata ya Masama Magharibi, Wilaya ya Hai
- Location within Tanzania
- Country: Tanzania
- Region: Kilimanjaro Region
- District: Hai District

Area
  - Total: 37.7 km^{2} (14.6 sq mi)
- Elevation: 1,185 m (3,888 ft)

Population (2012)
  - Total: 10,851
  - Density: 288/km^{2} (745/sq mi)

Masama Magharibi (West Masama in English) is an administrative ward in Hai District of Kilimanjaro Region in Tanzania. The ward covers an area of 37.7 km^{2} (14.6 sq mi), and has an average elevation of 1,185 m (3,888 ft). According to the 2012 census, the ward has a total population of 10,851.
