= Machame Uroki =

Ward in Hai District, Kilimanjaro Region

Machame Uroki Ward Kata ya Machame Uroki (Swahili)
- Ward
- Kata ya Machame Uroki, Wilaya ya Hai
- Location within Tanzania
- Country: Tanzania
- Region: Kilimanjaro Region
- District: Hai District

Area
  - Total: 13 km^{2} (5.0 sq mi)
- Elevation: 1,179 m (3,868 ft)

Population (2012)
  - Total: 10,762
  - Density: 830/km^{2} (2,100/sq mi)

Machame Uroki is an administrative ward in Hai District of Kilimanjaro Region in Tanzania. The ward covers an area of 13 km^{2} (5.0 sq mi), and has an average elevation of 1,179 m (3,868 ft). According to the 2012 census, the ward has a total population of 10,762.
