= Olkolili =

Ward in Siha District, Kilimanjaro Region

Olkolili Ward Kata ya Olkolili (Swahili)
- Ward
- Kata ya Olkolili, Wilaya ya Siha
- Location within Tanzania
- Country: Tanzania
- Region: Kilimanjaro Region
- District: Siha District

Area
  - Total: 84.45 km^{2} (32.61 sq mi)
- Elevation: 1,065 m (3,494 ft)

Population (2012)
  - Total: 12,896
  - Density: 152.7/km^{2} (395.5/sq mi)

Olkolili is an administrative ward in Siha District of Kilimanjaro Region in Tanzania. The ward covers an area of 172 km^{2} (66 sq mi), and has an average elevation of 1,065 m (3,494 ft). According to the 2012 census, the ward has a total population of 12,896.
