= Kindi (Tanzanian ward) =

Ward in Moshi, Kilimanjaro, Tanzania

Kindi Kata ya Kindi
- Ward
- Location within Tanzania
- Coordinates: 3.389254°S 37.316039°E
- Country: Tanzania
- Region: Kilimanjaro Region
- District: Moshi Rural
- Ward: Kindi

Population (2016)
  - Total: 22,943
- Time zone: UTC+3 (EAT)

Kindi is a town and ward in the Moshi Rural district of the Kilimanjaro Region of Tanzania. In 2016 the Tanzania National Bureau of Statistics report there were 22,943 people in the ward, from 21,391 in 2012.
