= Kibosho Mashariki =

Ward in Moshi, Kilimanjaro, Tanzania

Kibosho Mashariki Kata ya Kibosho Mashariki
- Ward
- Location within Tanzania
- Coordinates: 3.2489064°S 37.322037°E
- Country: Tanzania
- Region: Kilimanjaro Region
- District: Moshi Rural
- Ward: Kibosho Mashariki

Population (2016)
  - Total: 15,174
- Time zone: UTC+3 (EAT)

Kibosho Mashariki is a town and ward in the Moshi Rural district of the Kilimanjaro Region of Tanzania. In 2016 the Tanzania National Bureau of Statistics report there were 15,174 people in the ward, from 14,148 in 2012.
