= Kirua Vunjo Mashariki =

- Town and ward
- Interactive map of Kirua Vunjo Mashariki
- Coordinates: 3.34751017°S 37.4891024°E
- Country: Tanzania
- Region: Kilimanjaro Region
- District: Moshi Rural

Population (2012)
  - Total: 8,657
- Time zone: UTC+3 (EAT)

Kirua Vunjo Mashariki is a town and ward in the Moshi Rural district of the Kilimanjaro Region of Tanzania. Its population according to the 2012 census was 8,657.
