= Kashashi =

Ward in Siha District, Kilimanjaro Region

Kashashi Ward Kata ya Kashashi (Swahili)
- Ward
- Kata ya Kashashi, Wilaya ya Siha
- Location within Tanzania
- Country: Tanzania
- Region: Kilimanjaro Region
- District: Siha District

Area
  - Total: 28.27 km^{2} (10.92 sq mi)
- Elevation: 1,219 m (3,999 ft)

Population (2012)
  - Total: 6,694
  - Density: 236.8/km^{2} (613.3/sq mi)

Kashashi also known as Kashisha is an administrative ward in Siha District of Kilimanjaro Region in Tanzania. The ward covers an area of 28.27 km^{2} (10.92 sq mi), and has an average elevation of 1,219 m (3,999 ft). According to the 2012 census, the ward has a total population of 6,694.
