= Naeny =

Ward in Siha District, Kilimanjaro Region

Naeny Ward Kata ya Naeny (Swahili)
- Ward
- Kata ya Naeny, Wilaya ya Siha
- Location within Tanzania
- Country: Tanzania
- Region: Kilimanjaro Region
- District: Siha District

Area
  - Total: 26.32 km^{2} (10.16 sq mi)
- Elevation: 1,395 m (4,577 ft)

Population (2012)
  - Total: 10,748
  - Density: 408.4/km^{2} (1,058/sq mi)

Naeny also known as Ivaeny is an administrative ward in Siha District of Kilimanjaro Region in Tanzania. The ward covers an area of 26.32 km^{2} (10.16 sq mi), and has an average elevation of 1,395 m (4,577 ft). According to the 2012 census, the ward has a total population of 10,748.
