= Albert Msando =

Tanzanian politician

Albert Gasper Msando (born 8 November 1979) is a Tanzanian Lawyer and politician who is currently serving as Ubungo District Commissioner, prior to that he previously served as Morogoro District Commissioner Then Handeni District. Msando is also a former ward councilor for Mambogini ward in Moshi District for CHADEMA. Albert Msando was born on 8 November 1979.

Albert Gasper Msando was previously a member of Chama Cha Demokrasia na Maendeleo (CHADEMA). Msando Joined Chadema while studying Bachelor of Laws at the University of Dar es Salaam. He left CHADEMA party to ACT Wazalendo in 2014 and in 2017 he left ACT Wazalendo party and joined CCM. In 2021 he was appointed by the President of the United Republic of Tanzania H.E Samia Suluhu to be the District Commissioner for Morogoro District.
