= Marangu Mashariki =

Ward in Moshi, Kilimanjaro, Tanzania

Marangu Mashariki Kata ya Marangu Mashariki
- Ward
- Location within Tanzania
- Coordinates: 3.28334742°S 37.521572°E
- Country: Tanzania
- Region: Kilimanjaro Region
- District: Moshi Rural
- Ward: Marangu Mashariki

Population (2016)
  - Total: 25,456
- Time zone: UTC+3 (EAT)

Marangu Mashariki is a town and ward in the Moshi Rural district of the Kilimanjaro Region of Tanzania. In 2016 the Tanzania National Bureau of Statistics report there were 25,456 people in the ward, from 23,734 in 2012.
