= Kilema Kusini =

- Town and ward
- Location within Tanzania
- Coordinates: 3.393159°S 37.52444°E
- Country: Tanzania
- Region: Kilimanjaro Region
- District: Moshi Rural

Population (2012)
  - Total: 22,711
- Time zone: UTC+3 (EAT)

Kilema Kusini is a town and ward in the Moshi Rural district of the Kilimanjaro Region of Tanzania. Its population according to the 2012 census was 22,711.
