= Uru Kusini =

Ward in Moshi, Kilimanjaro, Tanzania

Uru Kusini Kata ya Uru Kusini
- Ward
- Location within Tanzania
- Coordinates: 3.29809104°S 37.3276561°E
- Country: Tanzania
- Region: Kilimanjaro Region
- District: Moshi Rural
- Ward: Uru Kusini

Population (2016)
  - Total: 24,565
- Time zone: UTC+3 (EAT)

Uru South is a ward located in the Moshi Rural district by the Kilimanjaro Region of Tanzania.

In 2016, the Tanzania National Bureau of Statistics reported that there were 24,565 people in the ward, from 22,904 in 2012.
