= Kirua Vunjo Kusini =

Ward in Moshi, Tanzania

- Town and ward
- Location in Tanzania
- Coordinates: 3.39205723°S 37.4635979°E
- Country: Tanzania
- Region: Kilimanjaro Region
- District: Moshi Rural

Population (2016)
  - Total: 20,784
- Time zone: UTC+3 (EAT)

Kirua Vunjo Kusini is a ward in the Moshi Rural district of the Kilimanjaro Region of Tanzania. In 2016 the Tanzania National Bureau of Statistics report there were 20,784 people in the ward, from 19,378 in 2012. The ward Compose five village which is Yamu, Uparo, Uchira, Makaaa and Mabungo.
