= Uru Kaskazini =

Ward in Moshi, Kilimanjaro, Tanzania

Uru Kaskazini Kata ya Uru Kaskazini
- Ward
- Location within Tanzania
- Coordinates: 3.24652502°S 37.3554337°E
- Country: Tanzania
- Region: Kilimanjaro Region
- District: Moshi Rural
- Ward: Uru Kaskazini

Population (2016)
  - Total: 11,885
- Time zone: UTC+3 (EAT)

Uru Kaskazini is a town and ward in the Moshi Rural district of the Kilimanjaro Region of Tanzania. In 2016 the Tanzania National Bureau of Statistics report there were 11,885 people in the ward, from 11,081 in 2012.
