= Kibosho Magharibi =

Ward in Moshi, Kilimanjaro, Tanzania

Kibosho Magharibi Kioso West Kibosho (English Name)
- Ward
- Location within Tanzania
- Coordinates: 3.2509211°S 37.316152°E
- Country: Tanzania
- Region: Kilimanjaro Region
- District: Moshi Rural
- Ward: Kibosho Magharibi
- Established: January 1984

Government
  - Ward Councillor: Hon. Deogratius Mushi

Population (2016)
  - Total: 21,763
- Time zone: UTC+3 (EAT)

Kibosho Magharibi is a town and ward in the Moshi Rural district of the Kilimanjaro Region of Tanzania. In 2016 the Tanzania National Bureau of Statistics report there were 21,763 people in the ward, from 20,291 in 2012.
