= Kilema Kaskazini =

- Town and ward
- Location in Tanzania
- Coordinates: 3.2591847°S 37.4675116°E
- Country: Tanzania
- Region: Kilimanjaro Region
- District: Moshi Rural

Population (2012)
  - Total: 9,669
- Time zone: UTC+3 (EAT)

Kilema Kaskazini is a town and ward in the Moshi Rural district of the Kilimanjaro Region of Tanzania. Its population according to the 2012 census was 9,669.
