= Gararagua =

Ward in Siha District, Kilimanjaro Region

Gararagua Kata ya Gararagua (Swahili)
- Ward
- Kata ya Gararagua, Wilaya ya Siha
- Location within Tanzania
- Country: Tanzania
- Region: Kilimanjaro Region
- District: Siha District

Area
  - Total: 122.9 km^{2} (47.5 sq mi)
- Elevation: 1,395 m (4,577 ft)

Population (2012)
  - Total: 9,884
  - Density: 80.42/km^{2} (208.3/sq mi)

Gararagua is an administrative ward in Siha District of Kilimanjaro Region in Tanzania. The ward covers an area of 122.9 km^{2} (47.5 sq mi), and has an average elevation of 1,395 m (4,577 ft). According to the 2012 census, the ward has a total population of 9,884.
