= Julian Smith (author) =

American author and journalist

- Born: Julian S. Smith; 1972 (age 53–54); Mount Kisco, New York
- Education: University of Virginia, B.A. Utah State University, M.S.
- Occupations: Author, journalist
- Writing career
- Language: English
- Genres: Travel, science, history, memoir, non-fiction
- Website: www.juliansmith.com

Julian Smith (born 1972 in Mount Kisco, New York) is an American author and journalist. He wrote Crossing the Heart of Africa, published in 2010 by Harper Perennial, and co-authored Smokejumper: A Memoir by One of America's Most Select Airborne Firefighters, published in 2015 by William Morrow. Smith and David Wolman are also co-authors of Aloha Rodeo: Three Hawaiian Cowboys, the World's Greatest Rodeo, and a Hidden History of the American West.

== Background ==
After growing up in Katonah, New York, he studied biology at the University of Virginia and wildlife ecology at Utah State University. He later helped launch and edit Frontiers in Ecology and the Environment, an international peer-reviewed scientific journal. He has taught writing, editing, and literature at the College of Santa Fe and the Gotham Writers Workshop. The father of two daughters, Smith lives in Portland, Oregon.

== Writing career ==
Smith has written for numerous publications, including Smithsonian, Wired, Outside, National Geographic Adventure, National Geographic Traveler, New Scientist, U.S. News & World Report, USA Today, the Los Angeles Times, Wend Magazine and The Washington Post.

Smith is the author of travel guidebooks to Virginia, Ecuador, and the US Southwest for Moon Publications. In 2004, his book Moon Handbooks Four Corners won the country’s top travel writing award from the Society of American Travel Writers.

In December 2010, Harper Perennial published his book Crossing the Heart of Africa: An Odyssey of Love and Adventure, an account of retracing the 1898-1900 route of British explorer Ewart Grogan across Africa. In 2007, Smith traveled from South Africa to Sudan, crossing eight countries in two months by bus, bicycle and ferry. Grogan's journey was itself the first transect of the continent from south to north, done in part to convince his beloved's stepfather that he was worth marrying.

Through Jason Ramos' eyes, Smokejumper: A Memoir by One of America's Most Select Airborne Firefighters provides an intimate look at the lives and history of smokejumpers, elite airborne firefighters who combat wildfires in remote and rugged areas of the United States.

Aloha Rodeo: Three Hawaiian Cowboys, the World's Greatest Rodeo, and a Hidden History of the American West charts the lost story of native Hawaiian cowboys who became rodeo champions in 1908, upending the American West's traditional narrative.

== Published works ==
=== As co-author or contributor ===
- Aloha Rodeo: Three Hawaiian Cowboys, the World's Greatest Rodeo, and a Hidden History of the American West
- Smokejumper: A Memoir by One of America's Most Select Airborne Firefighters
- 1000 Things to See Before You Die: USA and Canada
- Moon Handbooks Chesapeake Bay
- Grzimek’s Animal Life Encyclopedia
- Road Trip USA
- Road Trip USA California and the Southwest
- Online Travel Planning for Dummies

=== As author ===
- Crossing the Heart of Africa: An Odyssey of Love and Adventure
- Moon Handbooks Navajo & Hopi Country
- Moon Handbooks Northern Virginia
- Moon Handbooks Four Corners
- Moon Handbooks Virginia
- Moon Handbooks Ecuador
- On Your Own in El Salvador
