= Ewart Grogan =

English explorer (1874–1967)

Ewart Scott Grogan
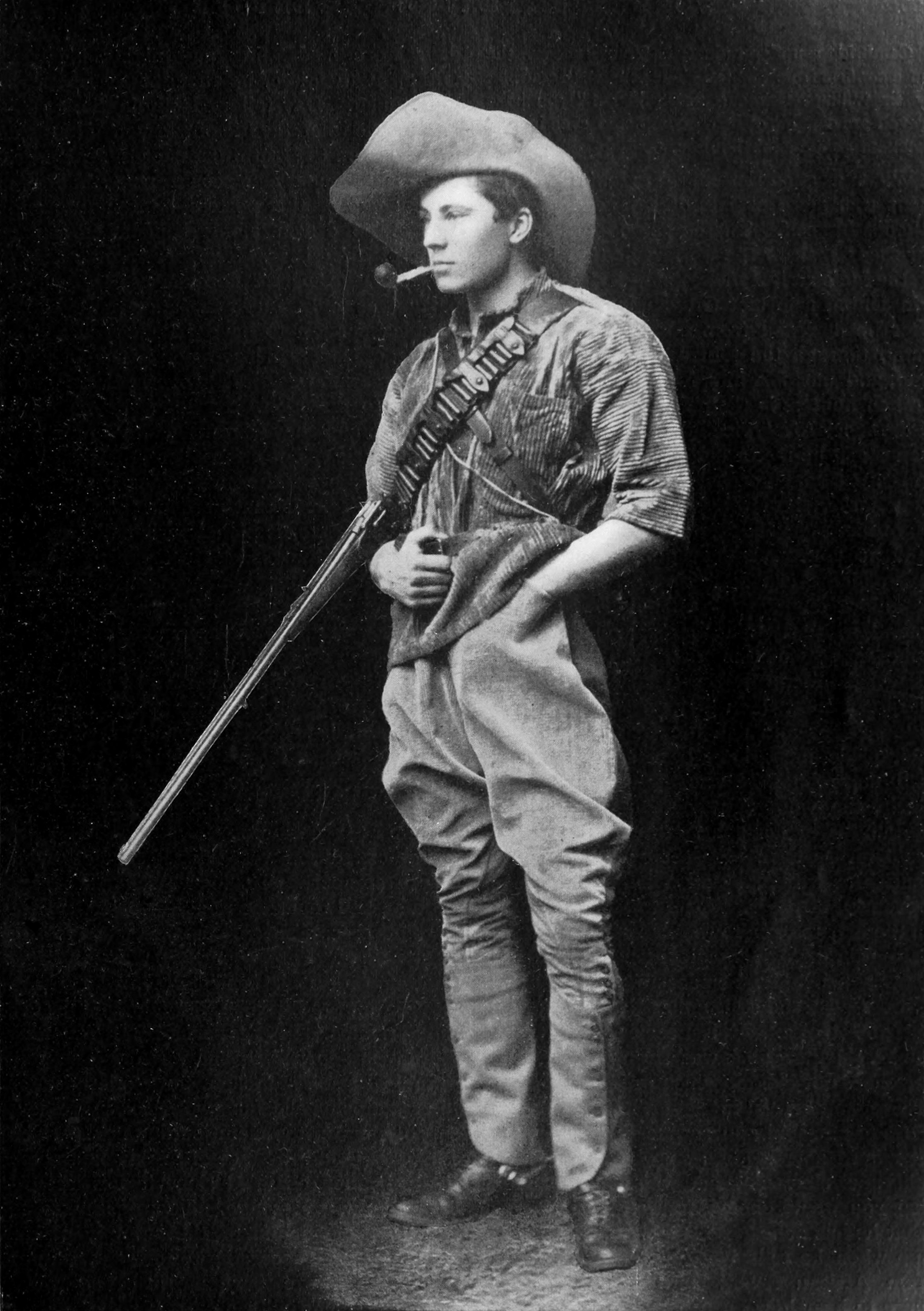
- Born: 12 December 1874; St George Hanover Square, London, England
- Died: 16 August 1967 (aged 92); Cape Town, South Africa
- Occupation: Explorer
- Known for: First person in recorded history to walk the length of Africa

Ewart Scott Grogan (1874–1967) was an English explorer, politician and entrepreneur. He was the first person in recorded history to walk the length of Africa, from Cape Town to Cairo.

== Biography ==
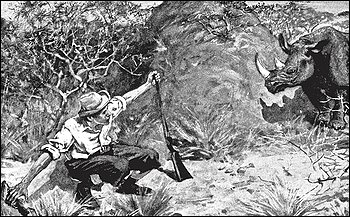
Grogan faces a rhinoceros on Mount Chiperoni. Illustration by Arthur David McCormick from From the Cape to Cairo.

Ewart Grogan was educated at Winchester College and Jesus College, Cambridge, which he left without taking a degree. He was expelled from both school and university. Grogan spent some time at the Slade School of Art

While up at Cambridge, he fell in love with Gertrude Watt, the sister of a classmate, Edward James Quadrant Watt, but her stepfather disapproved of the match. Grogan came from a respectable family, but his own life had little to recommend it. He proposed becoming the first man to make the Cape-to-Cairo journey; the stepfather agreed this would be a suitable test of his character and seriousness.

He then commenced his expedition from Cape Town to Cairo at the age of 24 and reached Cairo in 1900, after two-and-a-half years of travelling. He was in Bulawayo and helped defend the town in the 1896-7 Second Matabele War. Coincidentally, Robert Baden-Powell was also there with the army, and later, his brother Francis Baden-Powell would marry Gertrude's youngest sister, Florence.

During his travels, Grogan had been stalked by lions, hippopotamuses and crocodiles; pursued by headhunters and cannibals; and plagued by parasites and fevers. He returned home a popular sensation. He was made a Fellow of the Royal Geographical Society and met Queen Victoria. In four months of effort, Grogan wrote about his journey in From the Cape to Cairo; the First Traverse of Africa from South to North (1902). Capping his success, he married Gertrude at Christ Church, Lancaster Gate, Paddington, London on 11 October 1900.

Gertrude’s Children’s Hospital located in Nairobi, Kenya, was founded in 1947, with the donation of some land by Colonel Ewart Grogan, in memory of his wife, Gertrude Edith. The hospital now has seven branches spread out in the city's residential areas.

At Cambridge, Grogan was a member of the notorious and mysterious dining society, The Natives, a club that has run for over 135 years.

== First World War ==
In October 1914, Grogan traversed part of German East Africa to Kivu where he met his old friend the Belgian Josué Henry. Most of his subsequent life was spent in east Africa, mainly Kenya, where he settled. He died in South Africa at the age of 92.

General Election January 1910: Newcastle-under-Lyme
Party	Candidate	Votes	%	±%
Liberal	Josiah Wedgwood	5,613	56.9	− 6.7
Liberal Unionist	Ewart Grogan	4,245	43.1	+ 6.7
Majority		1,368	13.8	− 13.4
Turnout			93.8	+ 9.8
Liberal hold		Swing	6.7	

General Election December 1910: Newcastle-under-Lyme
Party	Candidate	Votes	%	±%
Liberal	Josiah Wedgwood	5,281	56.4	− 0.5
Liberal Unionist	Ewart Grogan	4,087	43.6	+ 0.5
Majority		1,194	12.8	− 1.0
Turnout			89.1	− 4.7
Liberal hold		Swing	0.5	

== Kenya ==
Ewart Grogan and his wife, Gertrude, arrived in Kenya in 1904. Making their way inland from Mombasa to Nairobi, Grogan swiftly became a leading figure in the Kenyan settler community and a key player in the economic development of the country. He initially made a number of real estate purchases including the Cross estate and the Manse estate, on which he built his famous house Chiromo. Grogan then began to look for further business opportunities including the potential of developing commercial logging near the Mau summit and for cattle grazing on the Uasin Gishu plateau.

In 1907, Grogan was involved in what became publicly known as the "Nairobi Incident" after his sister Dorothy and her friend alleged to have been shamefully treated by three Kikuyu rickshaw drivers, Grogan took it upon himself to punish the men by walking them into Nairobi and publicly flogging them. Grogan flogged the first man, the two others being flogged by other members of the settler community such as William Bowker. The event was widely reported around the world and was often erroneously reported as one of the Kikuyu men having been killed. In response to the disregard for colonial authority, Grogan and the two other men were tried and convicted. Grogan was sentenced to one month's prison and a Rs 500 fine.

Grogan continued to expand his business interests in Kenya both before and after the First World War, as well as completing the railway line to his logging concession. He subsequently sank a large portion of his wealth into building the first deep water harbour in Mombasa.

He later built the Torr's Hotel in Nairobi and was a proprietor with Lord Delamere of the East African Standard newspaper. When the war ended, Grogan had built significant business interests in Kenya including a ranch at Longonot, the Equator Saw mill, a rice mill and factory in Mwanza, land at Turi, a ranch on the Athi plains and a Kingatori coffee farm. These assets were sold to finance his next project the development of land in Taveta in southern Kenya, where he now spent most of his time. He invested a fortune to successfully irrigate and develop arid scrub into fertile productive land.

On the outbreak of the Second World War, Grogan, who was now aged in his sixties, immediately reported to Nairobi to General Douglas Dickinson. He was appointed Belgian liaison officer and carried out reconnaissance across the Congolese border. Later in the war he was promoted to lieutenant-colonel and put in charge of three prisoner of war camps in Gilgil and Nairobi. After the war, Grogan returned to Taveta, living in Grogan's Castle, the large house that he built on a hill overlooking the area. In 1943, Gertrude Grogan died from a heart attack in Nairobi. Grogan, seeking a fitting memorial for his wife, founded the Gertrude's Garden Children's Hospital of which there are now seven in present-day Nairobi.

Grogan was involved in politics all his life in Kenya by serving on the Colonial Association and the Legislative Council. Grogan took an interest in the advancement and education of the indigenous African population. He believed that 'the road of advancement must be open to all Africans' and only then could his vision of a 'reasonable and decent society in Africa' be fulfilled. Grogan had intended his Jipe Estate to be used as an agricultural college for Africans and offered it to the colonial government but never received a reply. Grogan kept abreast of politics in the colony during the struggle for independence, lunched on several occasions with Tom Mboya at the Torrs Hotel and proclaimed him a 'very remarkable young African'. Grogan served on the Legislative Council throughout Kenya's move to independence. In his later years Grogan lived with companion Camilla Towers at his house in Taveta, Kenya, until his death in South Africa at the age of 92.

== Legacy ==
In 2007, the American journalist Julian Smith retraced Grogan's route from South Africa to southern Sudan, and wrote about it in the book Crossing the Heart of Africa (2010). The book also re-tells Grogan's journey and life story.

== Works ==
- "The Nile as I saw it" . The Empire and the Century. London: John Murray. 1905. pp. 809–16.

== Bibliography ==
- Bailey, Jim, ed. (1993). Kenya, the National Epic: From the Pages of Drum Magazine. Nairobi: Kenway Publishers.
- Grogan, Eward; Sharp, Arthur H. (1900). From the Cape to Cairo: the first traverse of Africa from south to north. London: Hurst and Blackett.
- Paice, Edward (2007). Tip & Run: The Untold Tragedy of the Great War in Africa. London: Phoenix. ISBN 978-0-7538-2349-1.
- Paice, Edward (2002). Lost Lion of Empire: The Life of 'Cape-to-Cairo' Grogan. HarperCollins UK. ISBN 978-0-00-653073-2.
