= Kirima (Tanzanian ward) =

Ward in Kilimanjaro, Tanzania

- Town and ward
- Location in Tanzania
- Coordinates: 3.281458°S 37.301275°E
- Country: Tanzania
- Region: Kilimanjaro Region
- District: Moshi Rural

Population (2012)
  - Total: 10,709
- Time zone: UTC+3 (EAT)

Kirima is a town and ward in the Moshi Rural district of the Kilimanjaro Region of Tanzania. In 2016 the Tanzania National Bureau of Statistics report there were 11,486 people in the ward, from 10,709 in 2012.
