= Mamba Kusini =

Ward in Moshi, Kilimanjaro, Tanzania

Mamba Kusini Kata ya Mamba Kusini
- Ward
- Location within Tanzania
- Coordinates: 3.30451526°S 37.54531654°E
- Country: Tanzania
- Region: Kilimanjaro Region
- District: Moshi Rural
- Ward: Mamba Kusini

Population (2016)
  - Total: 10,790
- Time zone: UTC+3 (EAT)

Mamba Kusini is a town and ward in the Moshi Rural district of the Kilimanjaro Region of Tanzania. In 2016 the Tanzania National Bureau of Statistics report there were 10,790 people in the ward, from 10,060 in 2012.
