= Mabogini =

Ward in Moshi, Kilimanjaro, Tanzania

Mabogini Kata ya Mabogini
- Ward
- Location within Tanzania
- Coordinates: 3.432460586°S 37.36092792°E
- Country: Tanzania
- Region: Kilimanjaro Region
- District: Moshi Rural
- Ward: Mabogini

Population (2016)
  - Total: 31,095
- Time zone: UTC+3 (EAT)

Mabogini is a town and ward in the Moshi Rural district of the Kilimanjaro Region of Tanzania.

In 2016 the Tanzania National Bureau of Statistics report there were 31,095 people in the ward, from 28,992 in 2012.
