= Russell Bowker =

South African settler in Kenya

William Russell Bowker (1855 - 16 July 1916) was an early and prominent South African settler in Kenya.

== Early life ==
William Russell Bowker was born in 1855 in Grahamstown, Cape Colony. He was the eleventh child of Bertram Egerton Bowker, who had migrated from Northumberland, England to South Africa with the 1820 Settlers.

His uncles had fought in the 6th, 7th, and 8th Xhosa Wars, and his father raised and commanded Bowker’s Rovers during the 1877 Xhosa War, with whom William and his brother George served as Troopers, receiving the South Africa Medal (1877).

Bowker served with distinction during the Second Boer War, serving as a Lieutenant in the Border Horse from February 17 - May 20, 1900, and then as a Captain in the Johannesburg Mounted Rifles. His brother George also served as a Lieutenant in the Border Horse in the war.

== East Africa ==
Bowker first visited the East Africa Protectorate in 1901 and became impressed by the farming and ranching opportunities in the new country. On his return to South Africa, motivated by Sir Charles Eliot's call for settlers, he sold his estates and recruited a group of aspiring farmers keen to settle in the Protectorate. In 1904 he returned to the Protectorate and impressed Eliot with his efforts to encourage settlement. He made an application for land, and was granted a lease for 30,000 acres in the Kedong valley.

In 1907, together with Ewart Grogan and others, he was involved in an altercation with three Kikuyu men in Nairobi. The incident achieved notoriety at the time due to the heavy handedness of Bowker and his accomplices. Despite his protestations of innocence, the government was keen to set an example and arrested him for illegal assembly, later sentencing him to fourteen days imprisonment and a fine of 250 rupees.

During the First World War he organised a group of irregulars and raised a cavalry known as "Bowker's Horse" which became part of the East African Mounted Rifles. He died from pneumonia whilst on the field on 16 July 1916 and was buried at Mount Margaret in the Kedong valley.
