= Masama Kusini =

Ward in Hai District, Kilimanjaro Region

Masama Kusini Ward Kata ya Masama Kusini (Swahili)
- Ward
- Kata ya Masama Kusini, Wilaya ya Hai
- Location within Tanzania
- Country: Tanzania
- Region: Kilimanjaro Region
- District: Hai District

Area
  - Total: 65.2 km^{2} (25.2 sq mi)
- Elevation: 960 m (3,150 ft)

Population (2012)
  - Total: 12,060
  - Density: 185/km^{2} (479/sq mi)

Masama Kusini (South Masama in English) is an administrative ward in Hai District of Kilimanjaro Region in Tanzania. The ward covers an area of 65.2 km^{2} (25.2 sq mi), and has an average elevation of 960 m (3,150 ft). According to the 2012 census, the ward has a total population of 12,060.
