= Mamba Kaskazini =

Ward in Moshi, Kilimanjaro, Tanzania

Mamba Kaskazini Kata ya Mamba Kaskazini
- Ward
- Location within Tanzania
- Coordinates: 3.26452684°S 37.5419785°E
- Country: Tanzania
- Region: Kilimanjaro Region
- District: Moshi Rural
- Ward: Mamba Kaskazini

Population (2016)
  - Total: 9,723
- Time zone: UTC+3 (EAT)

Mamba Kaskazini is a town and ward in the Moshi Rural district of the Kilimanjaro Region of Tanzania. In 2016 the Tanzania National Bureau of Statistics report there were 9,723 people in the ward, from 9,065 in 2012.
