= Rombo District, Kilimanjaro =

District of Kilimanjaro Region, Tanzania

Rombo Wilaya ya Rombo (Swahili)
- District
- Wilaya ya Rombo, Mkoa wa Kilimanjaro
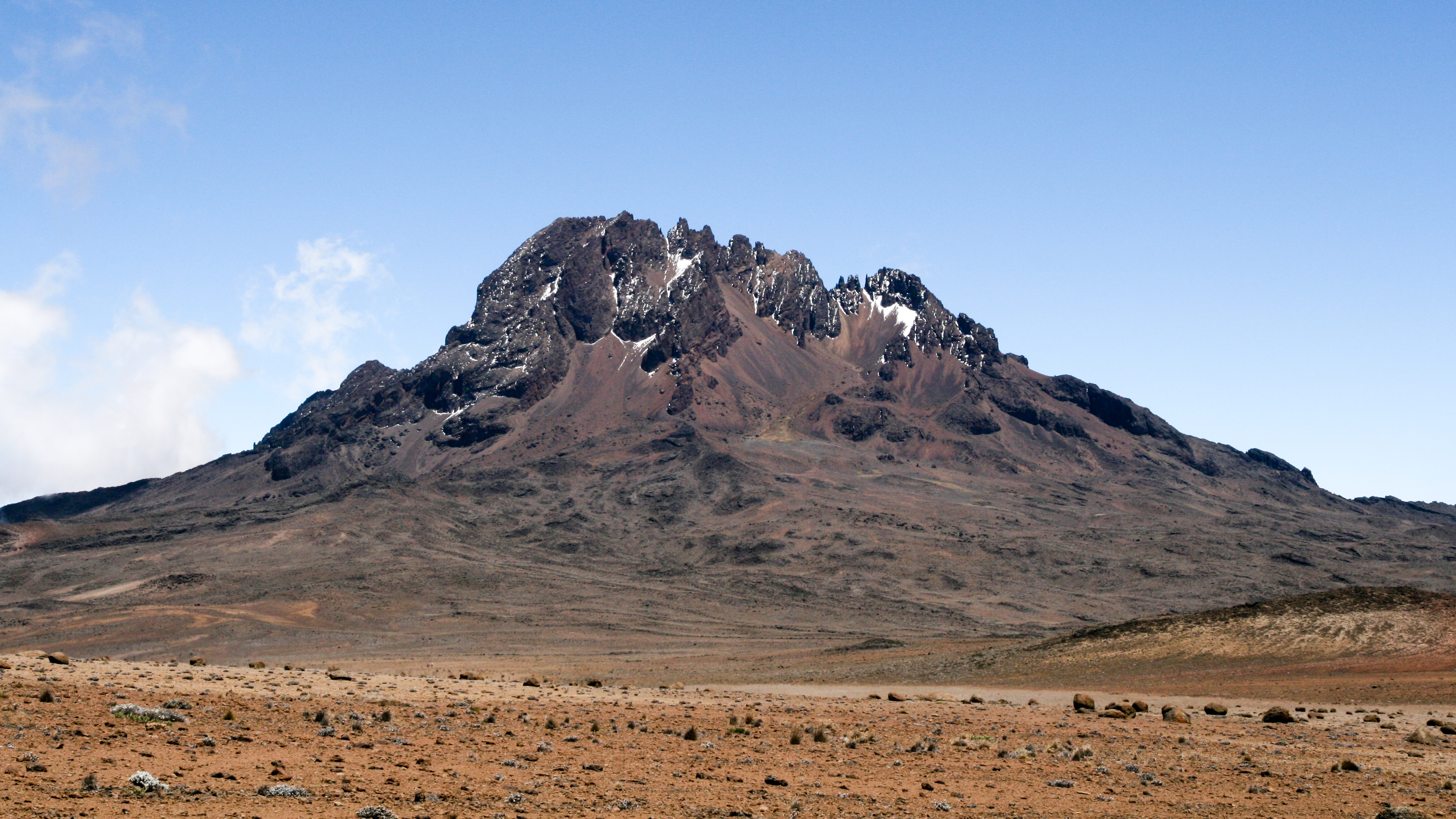
- Mawenzi Peak in Rombo District
- Nickname: Kili Sunrise
- Rombo District in Kilimanjaro Region 2022
- Coordinates: 3°20′34.8″S 37°21′2.52″E
- Country: Tanzania
- Region: Kilimanjaro Region
- Named for: King Orombo
- Capital: Moshi

Area
  - Total: 1,471 km^{2} (568 sq mi)
- Highest elevation (Uhuru Peak): 5,895 m (19,341 ft)

Population (2022)
  - Total: 275,314
  - Density: 187.2/km^{2} (484.7/sq mi)
- Demonym: Rombian

Ethnic groups
  - Settler: Swahili
  - Native: Chaga
- Tanzanian Postal Code: 25-7
- Website: District website

Rombo is one of the seven districts of the Kilimanjaro Region of Tanzania. It covers an area of 1,471 km^{2} (568 sq mi). It is bordered to the north and east by Kenya, to the west by the Siha District and Hai District, and to the south by the Moshi Rural District. The Rombo District contains a large portion of Kilimanjaro National Park. According to the 2022 census, the population of the Rombo District was 275,314.

== Administrative subdivisions ==
=== Wards ===
Rombo is divided administratively into 24 wards:

- Aleni
- Holili
- Katangara Mrere
- Kelamfua Mokala
- Keni Mengeni
- Kirongo Samanga
- Kirwa Keni
- Kisale Msaranga

- Kitirima Kingachi
- Mahida
- Makiidi
- Mamsera
- Manda
- Marangu Kitowo
- Mengwe
- Motamburu Kitendeni

- Mrao Keryo
- Nanjara Reha
- Ngoyoni
- Olele
- Shimbi
- Tarakea Motamburu
- Ubetu Kahe
- Ushiri Ikuini

== Health care ==
As of 2022, Rombo District is home to six health centers and 37 clinics.
