= Mwika Kaskazini =

Ward in Moshi, Kilimanjaro, Tanzania

Mwika Kaskazini Kata ya Mwika Kaskazini
- Ward
- Location within Tanzania
- Coordinates: 3.3227435°S 37.5802505°E
- Country: Tanzania
- Region: Kilimanjaro Region
- District: Moshi Rural
- Ward: Mwika Kaskazini

Population (2016)
  - Total: 22,713
- Time zone: UTC+3 (EAT)

Mwika Kaskazini is a town and ward in the Moshi Rural district of the Kilimanjaro Region of Tanzania. In 2016 the Tanzania National Bureau of Statistics report there were 22,713 people in the ward, from 21,177 in 2012.
