= Moshi District, Kilimanjaro =

District of Kilimanjaro Region, Tanzania

Moshi Wilaya ya Moshi (Swahili)
- District
- Wilaya ya Moshi, Mkoa wa Kilimanjaro
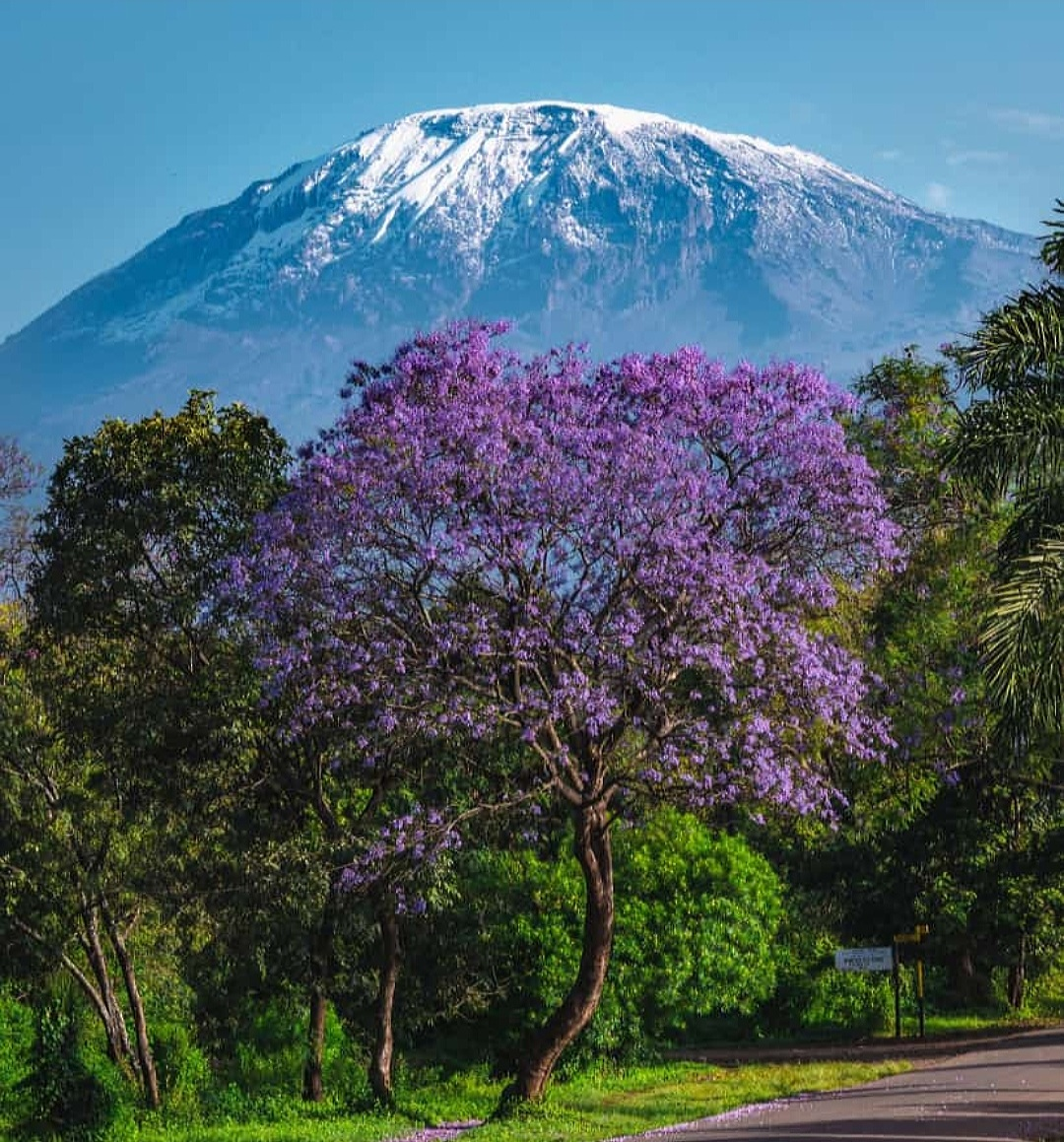
- Kilimajaro view from Shanty Town, Moshi Municipality
- Nickname: Breadbasket of Kilimanjaro
- Moshi District in Kilimanjaro Region 2022
- Coordinates: 3°20′43.44″S 37°29′2.76″E
- Country: Tanzania
- Region: Kilimanjaro Region
- District: 1984
- Capital: Moshi

Area
  - Total: 1,300 km^{2} (500 sq mi)

Population (2022)
  - Total: 535,803
  - Density: 410/km^{2} (1,100/sq mi)
- Demonym: Moshian

Ethnic groups
  - Settler: Swahili
  - Native: Chaga
- Tanzanian Postal Code: 25-2
- Website: District website

Moshi is one of the seven administrative districts of the Kilimanjaro Region of Tanzania. The district covers an area of 1,300 km^{2} (500 sq mi). The District is bordered to the north by the Rombo District, to the west by the Hai District, to the east by the Mwanga District and Kenya, and to the south by Simanjiro District of Manyara Region. The district also surrounds Moshi Municipal District on three sides. According to the 2012 census, the population of the Moshi District was 466,737. By 2022, the population had grown to 535,803.

== Administrative subdivisions ==
=== Wards ===
The Moshi District is administratively divided into 31 wards:

- Arusha Chini
- Kahe
- Kahe Mashariki
- Kibosho Kati
- Kibosho Magharibi
- Kibosho Mashariki
- Kilema Kaskazini
- Kilema Kati
- Kilema Kusini
- Kimochi

- Kindi
- Kirima
- Kirua Vunjo Kusini
- Kirua Vunjo Magharibi
- Kirua Vunjo Mashariki
- Mamba Kaskazini
- Mamba Kusini
- Marangu Magharibi
- Marangu Mashariki
- Mabogini

- Makuyuni
- Mbokomu
- Mwika Kaskazini
- Mwika Kusini
- Okoani
- Old Moshi Magharibi
- Old Moshi Mashariki
- Uru Mashariki
- Uru Shimbwe
- Uru Kusini
- Uru Kaskazini

== Sister cities ==
Kiel (Germany) is a sister city of Moshi Rural.
