= Kilimanjaro National Park =

National park in Kilimanjaro Region of Tanzania

- IUCN category II (national park)
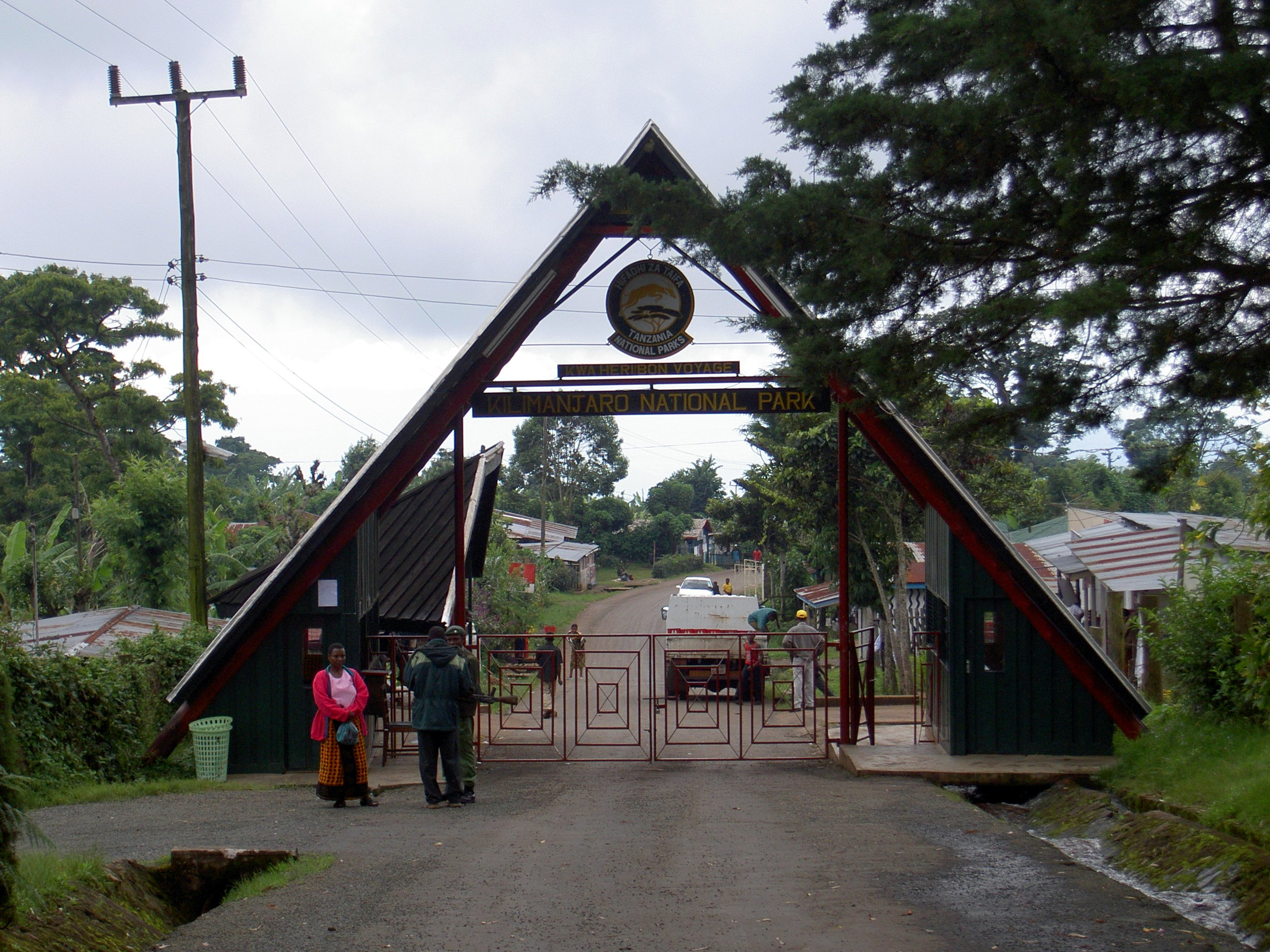
- The entrance to Kilimanjaro National Park

- Location within Tanzania
- Location: Kilimanjaro Region, Tanzania
- Nearest city: Moshi
- Coordinates: 3°04′S 37°22′E
- Area: 1,688 km^{2} (652 mi^{2})
- Established: 1973
- Visitors: c. 52,000 per year
- Governing body: Tanzania National Parks Authority
- Website: www.tanzaniaparks.go.tz

UNESCO World Heritage Site
- Type: Natural
- Criteria: vii
- Designated: 1987 (11th session)
- Reference no.: 403
- Region: Africa

Kilimanjaro National Park (Hifadhi ya Taifa ya Kilimanjaro, in Swahili) is a national park of Tanzania situated about 300 kilometres (190 mi) south of the equator in the Kilimanjaro Region, Tanzania, near the region of Moshi. The park includes the whole of Mount Kilimanjaro above the tree line and the surrounding montane forest belt above 1,820 metres (5,970 ft). It covers an area of 1,688 square kilometres (652 mi^{2}), 2°50'–3°10'S 37°10'–37°40'E. The park is administered by the Tanzania National Parks Authority (TANAPA). It was established as a national park in 1973. It was declared a World Heritage Site by UNESCO in 1987 and one of the Seven Natural Wonders of Africa in 2013.

The Park Headquarters is at Marangu, about 44 Km from Moshi town and 86km from Kilimanjaro International Airport

The park generated US$51 million in revenue in 2013, the second-most of any Tanzanian national park, and was one of only two Tanzanian national parks to generate a surplus during the 2012–2013 budget year. (The Ngorongoro Conservation Area, which includes the heavily visited Ngorongoro Crater, is not a national park.) TANAPA has reported that the park recorded 58,460 tourists during the 2012–2013 budget year, of whom 54,584 were foreigners. Of the park's 57,456 tourists during the 2011–2012 budget year, 16,425 hiked the mountain, which was well below the capacity of 28,470 as specified in the park's General Management Plan.

== History ==
In the early twentieth century, Mount Kilimanjaro and its surrounding forests were declared a game reserve by the German colonial government. In 1921, it was designated a forest reserve. In 1973, the mountain above the tree line (about 2,700 metres (8,900 ft)) was reclassified as a national park. The park was declared a World Heritage Site by the United Nations Educational, Scientific and Cultural Organization in 1987. In 2005, the park was expanded to include the entire montane forest, which had been part of the Kilimanjaro Forest Reserve.

== Tourism ==
Mount Kilimanjaro is the primary attraction of the park, and summit attempts account for the majority of visitor activity. Climbing is permitted only via designated routes and must be undertaken with licensed guides in accordance with park regulations administered by the Tanzania National Parks Authority (TANAPA).

The officially recognized ascent routes are:

- Marangu Route
- Machame Route
- Lemosho Route
- Northern Circuit Route
- Rongai Route
- Umbwe Route
- Shira Route

== Fauna ==
A variety of animals can be found in the park. Above the timberline, the Kilimanjaro tree hyrax, the grey duiker, and rodents are frequently encountered. The bushbuck and red duiker appear above the timberline in places. Cape buffaloes are found in the montane forest and occasionally in the moorland and grassland. Elephants can be found between the Namwai and Tarakia rivers and sometimes occur at higher elevations. In the montane forests, blue monkeys, eastern black and white colobuses, bushbabies, and leopards can be found.

== See also ==
- List of protected areas of Tanzania
- Marangu
- Chaga people

== Gallery ==
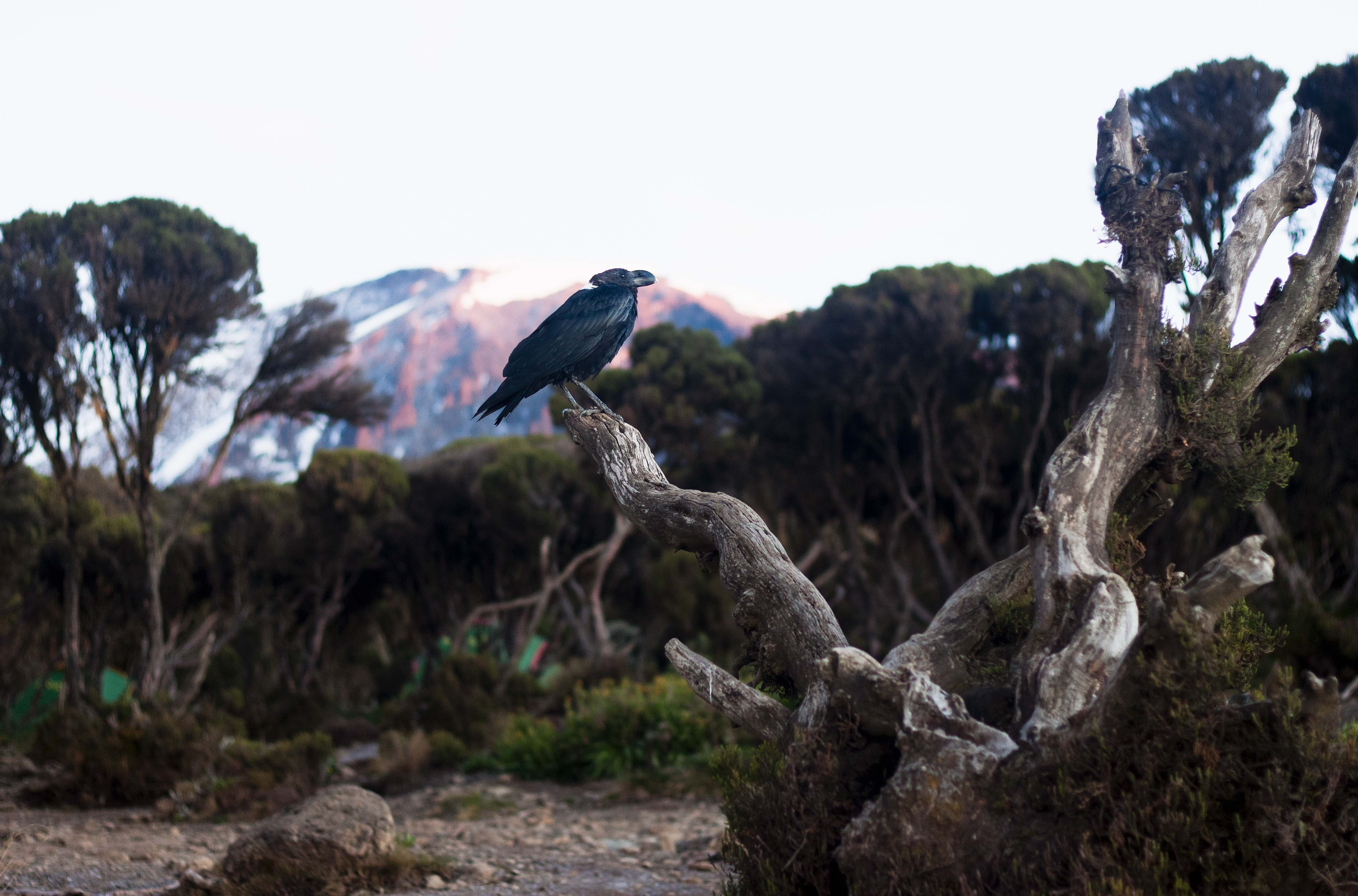
White-necked raven on Kilimanjaro

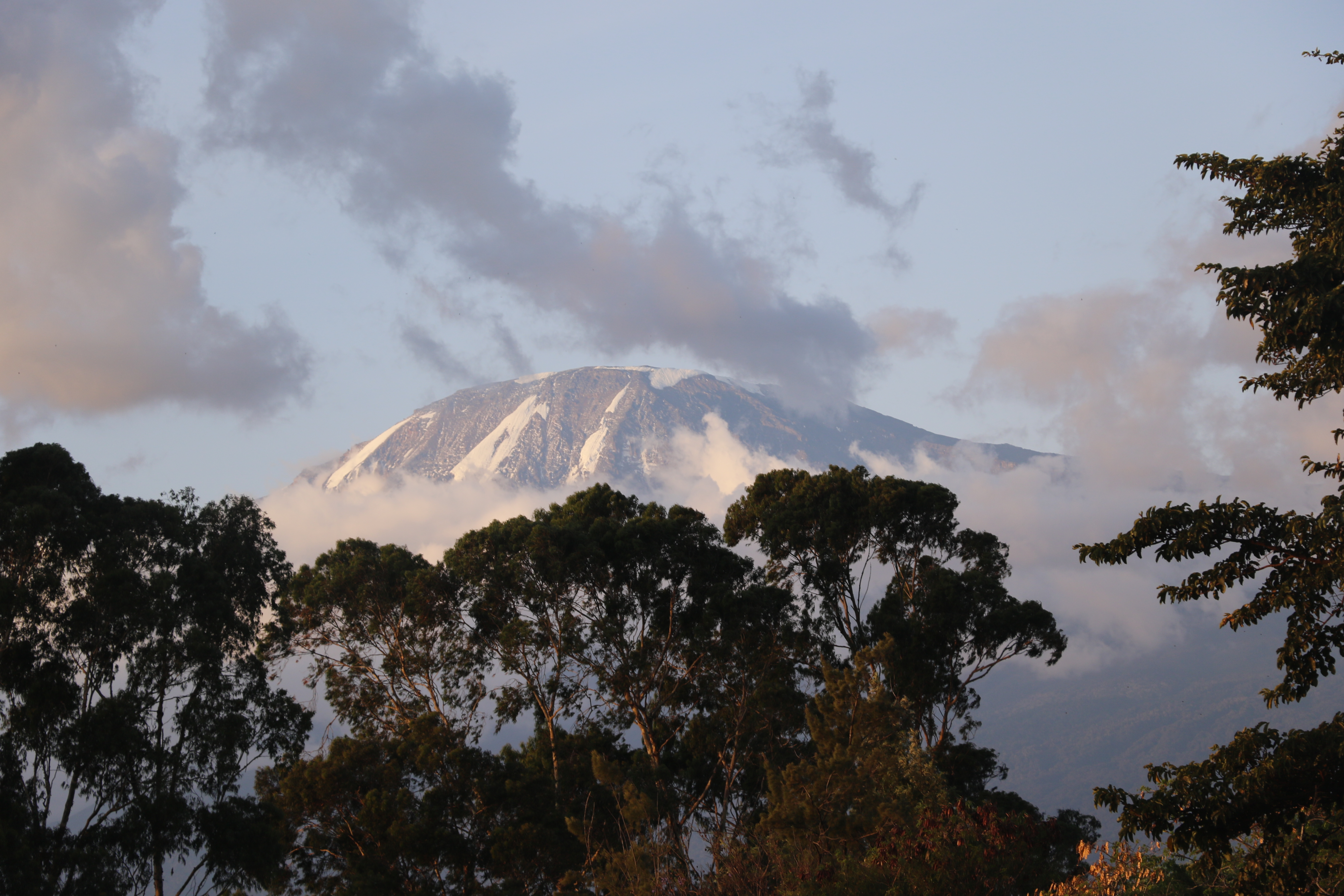
The Mount Kilimanjaro

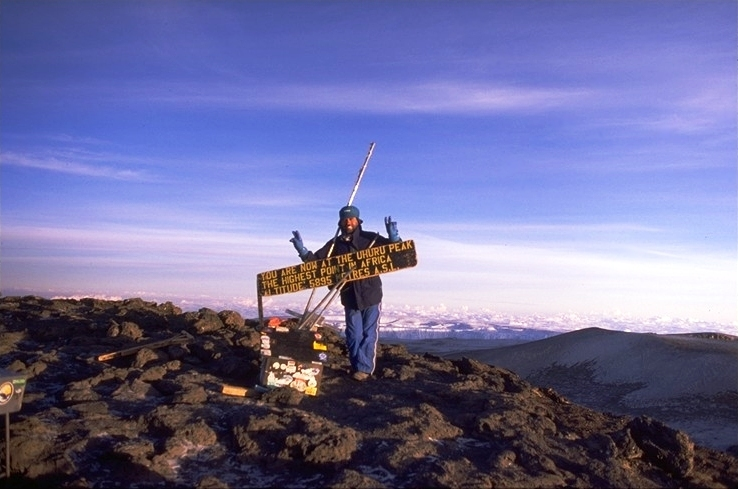
Uhuru Peak - Mt.Kilimanjaro
