= Hai District, Kilimanjaro =

District of Kilimanjaro Region, Tanzania

Hai Wilaya ya Hai (Swahili)
- District
- Wilaya ya Hai, Mkoa wa Kilimanjaro
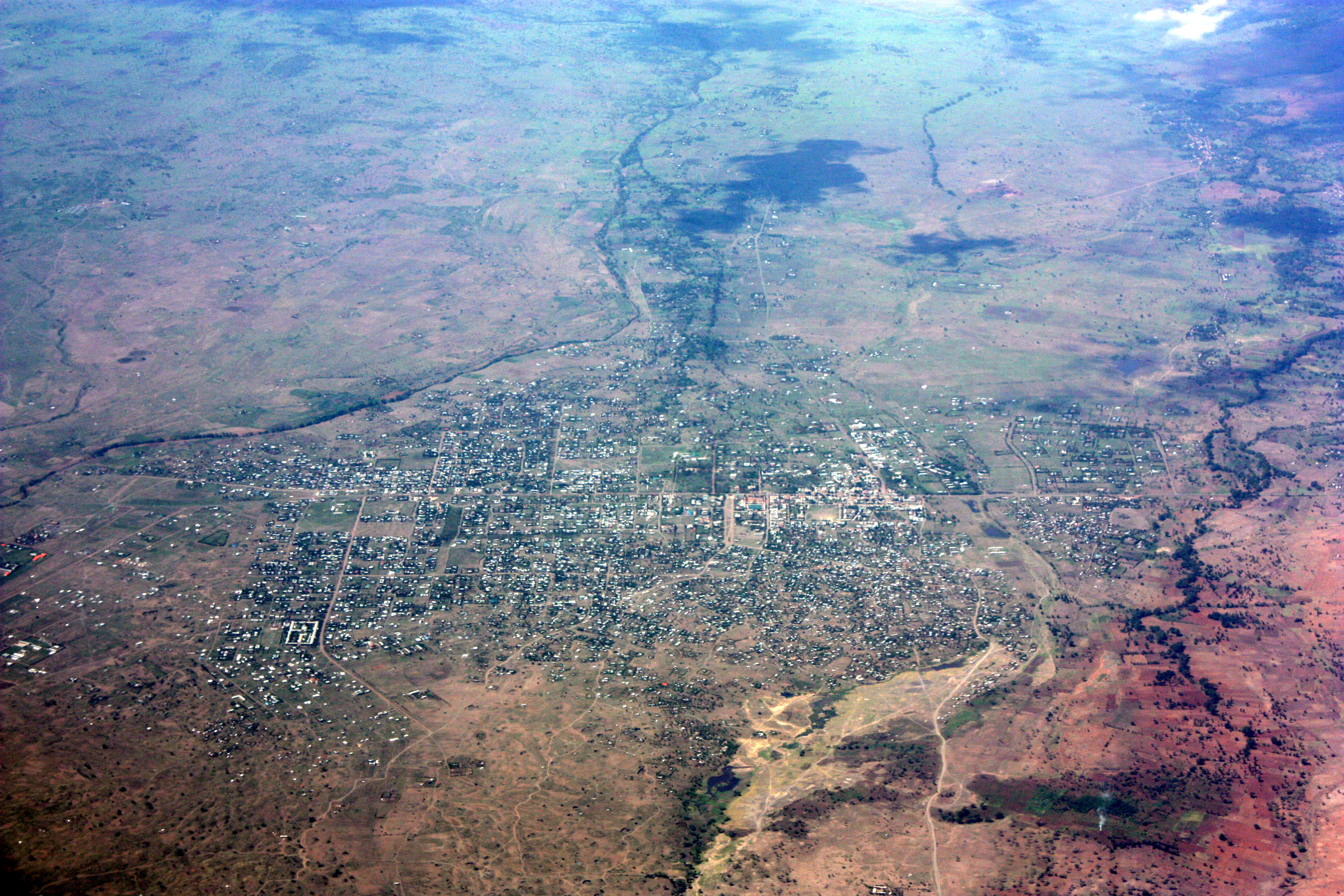
- Aerial Photo of Boma la Ngombe, Hai District
- Nickname: Gateway to Kilimanjaro
- Hai District in Kilimanjaro Region 2022
- Coordinates: 3°24′30.24″S 37°10′7.32″E
- Country: Tanzania
- Region: Kilimanjaro Region
- Capital: Hai Mjini

Area
  - Total: 902 km^{2} (348 sq mi)

Population (2012)
  - Total: 210,533
  - Density: 233/km^{2} (605/sq mi)
- Demonym: Haian

Ethnic groups
  - Settler: Swahili
  - Native: Chaga
- Tanzanian Postal Code: 25-3
- Website: District website

Hai is one of the seven districts of the Kilimanjaro Region of Tanzania.The district covers approximately 1,217 square kilometres (470 mi^{2}). It is bordered to the southwest by the Meru District of Arusha Region, to the west by the Siha District, and to the east by the Moshi Urban District and Moshi Rural District and the Rombo District to the far north. The western breach part of Mount Kilimanjaro is located in the Hai District. According to the 2022 census, the population of the Hai District was 240,999.

== Administrative subdivisions ==
=== Wards ===
The Hai District is divided administratively into 10 wards:

- Bomang'ombe
- Bondeni
- Muungano
- Mnadani
- Weruweru
- Kia
- Machame Kaskazini
- Machame Magharibi
- Machame Mashariki
- Machame Narumu
- Machame Uroki
- Masama Kusini
- Masama Magharibi
- Masama Mashariki
- Masama Kati
- Romu
- Masama Rundugai

In the Hai District, 80 percent of inhabitants have clean drinking water, and there are two new water supply schemes under construction to help the rest of the population. These are owned and operated by the people of Hai, and this makes them accountable for their own water.
