= Siha District, Kilimanjaro =

District of Kilimanjaro Region, Tanzania

Siha Wilaya ya Siha (Swahili)
- District
- Wilaya ya Siha, Mkoa wa Kilimanjaro
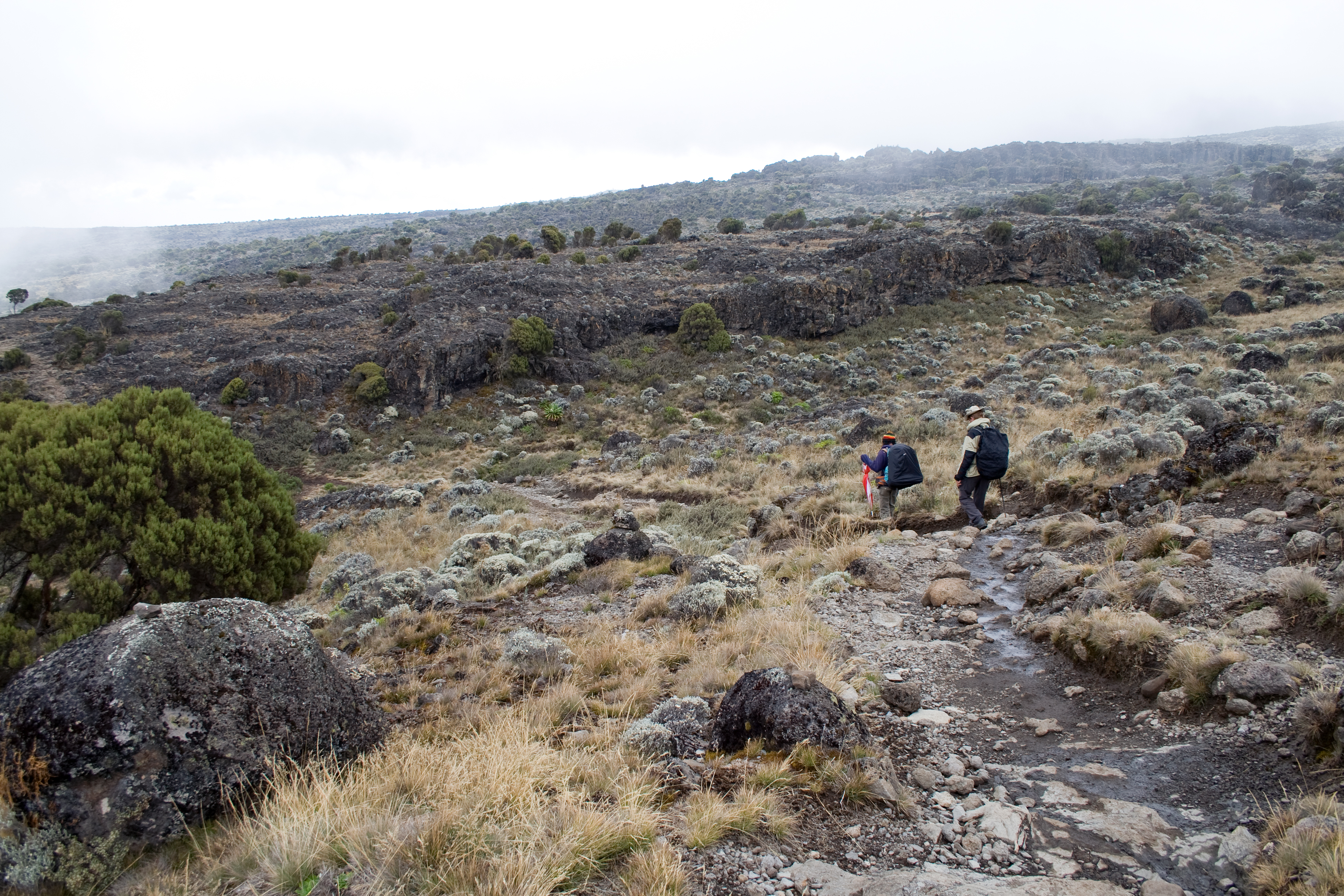
- Shira Plateau, Siha District
- Nickname: West Kili
- Siha District in Kilimanjaro Region 2022
- Coordinates: 03°11′11″S 37°04′07″E
- Country: Tanzania
- Region: Kilimanjaro Region
- Capital: Sanya Juu

Area
  - Total: 1,217 km^{2} (470 sq mi)
- Highest elevation (Klute Peak, Shira Plateau, Mount Kilimanjaro): 3,952 m (12,966 ft)

Population (2022)
  - Total: 139,019
  - Density: 114.2/km^{2} (295.9/sq mi)
- Demonym: Sihan

Ethnic groups
  - Settler: Swahili
  - Native: Chaga
- Tanzanian Postal Code: 25-4
- Website: District website

Siha is one of the seven administrative districts of Kilimanjaro Region in Tanzania. The district covers approximately 1,217 square kilometres (470 mi^{2}). It is bordered to the west by Meru District in Arusha Region and to the northeast by Rombo District and the southeast Hai District. The western part of Mount Kilimanjaro is located within the district's boundaries. The district covers the former Chagga state of Siha.

According to the 2022 Tanzania National Census, the population of Siha District was 139,019.

== Administrative subdivisions ==
As of 2012, Siha District was administratively divided into 12 wards.

=== Wards ===
- Biriri
- Gararagua
- Naeny
- Karansi
- Kashashi
- Livishi
- Makiwaru
- Nasai
- Ndumeti
- Ngarenairobi
- Olkolili
- Sanya Juu
