= Kilimanjaro Region =

Region of Tanzania

Kilimanjaro Region Mkoa wa Kilimanjaro (Swahili)
- Region
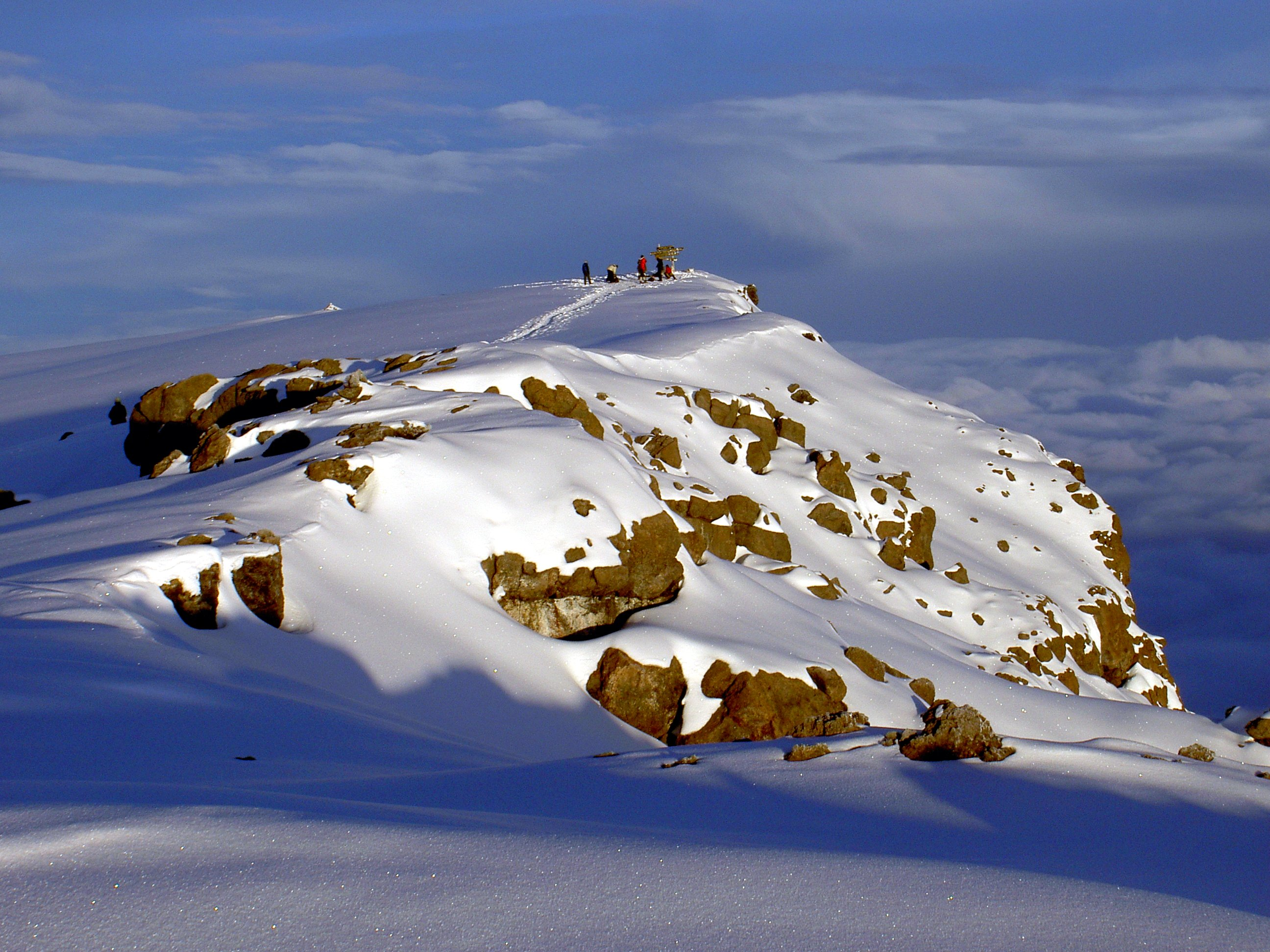
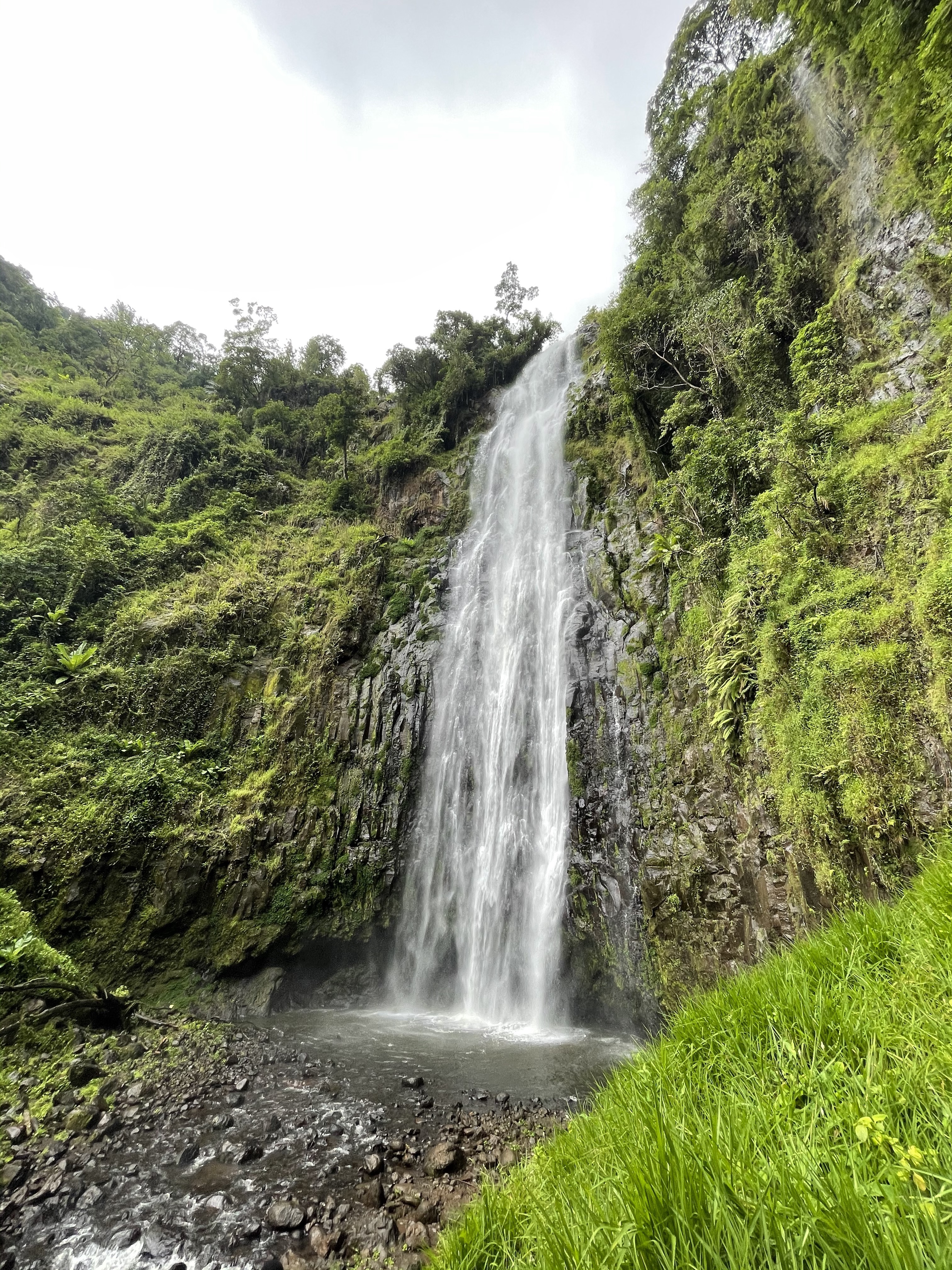
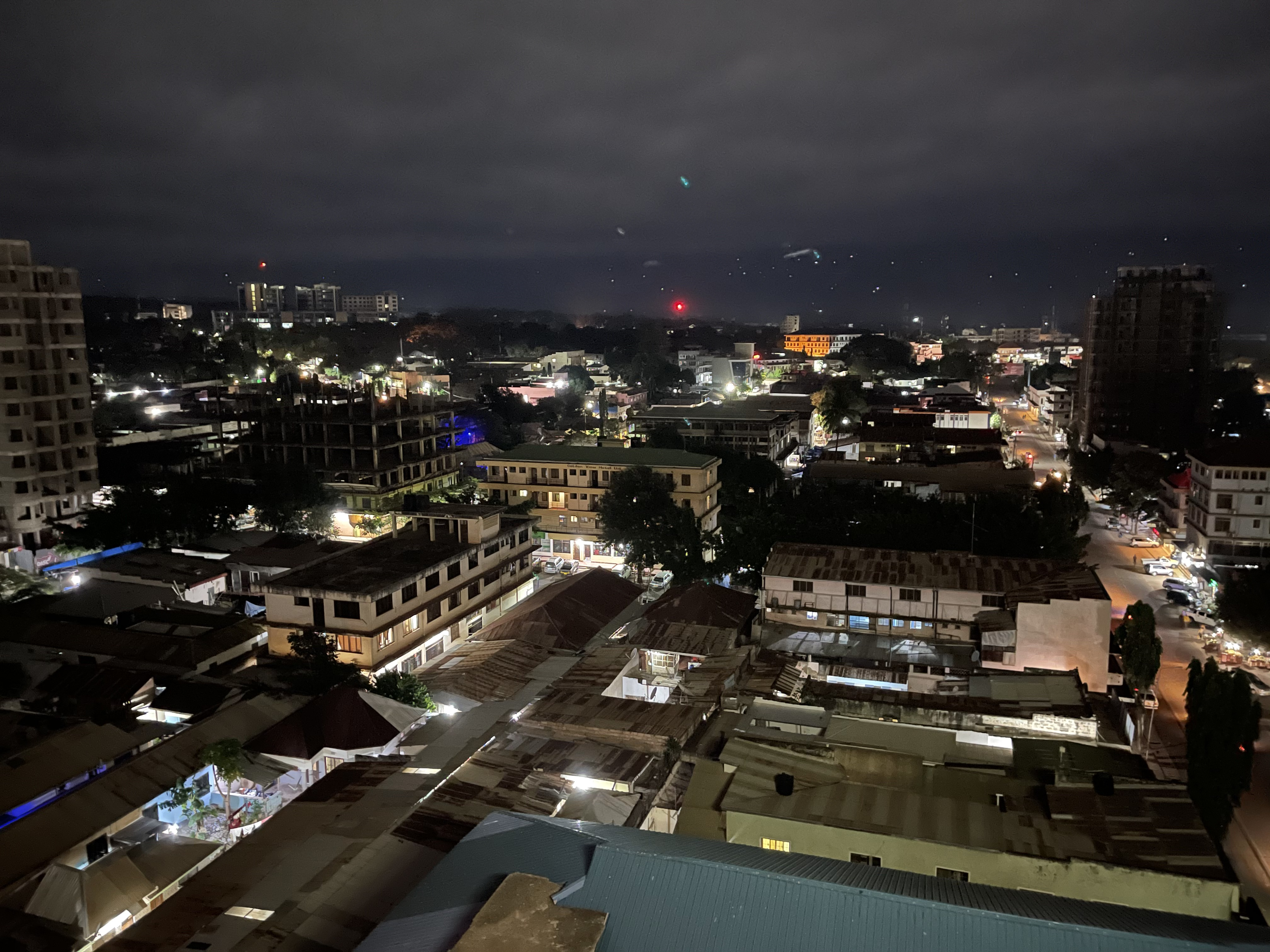
- From top to bottom: Uhuru Peak, Materuni falls and Moshi City at Night
- Nickname: The roof of Africa
- Location in Tanzania
- Coordinates: 4°8′1.32″S 37°48′31.68″E
- Country: Tanzania
- Zone: Northern
- Named for: Mount Kilimanjaro
- Capital: Moshi
- Districts: List: Hai District; Moshi District; Moshi Rural District; Mwanga District; Rombo District; Same District; Siha District

Government
  - Regional Commissioner: Nurdin Babu

Area
  - Total: 13,250 km^{2} (5,120 sq mi)
  - Rank: 24th of 31
- Highest elevation (Uhuru Peak): 5,895 m (19,341 ft)

Population (2022)
  - Total: 1,861,934
  - Rank: 19th of 31
  - Density: 140.5/km^{2} (364.0/sq mi)
- Demonym: Kilimanjaran

Ethnic groups
  - Settler: Swahili
  - Native: Chaga
- Time zone: UTC+3 (EAT)
- Postcode: 25xxx
- Area code: 027
- ISO 3166 code: TZ-09
- HDI (2021): 0.640 medium · 3rd
- Website: Official website
- Symbols of Tanzania
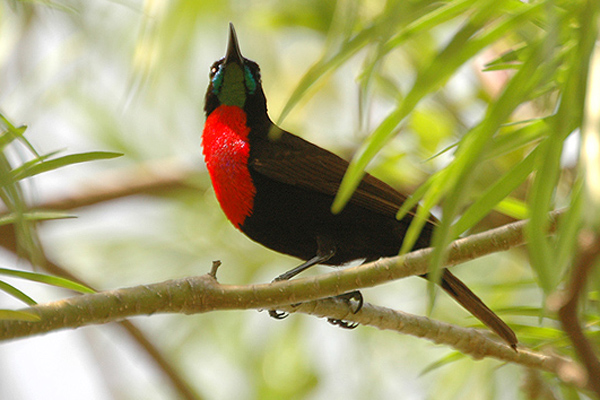
- Bird: Scarlet Tufted Malachite Sunbird

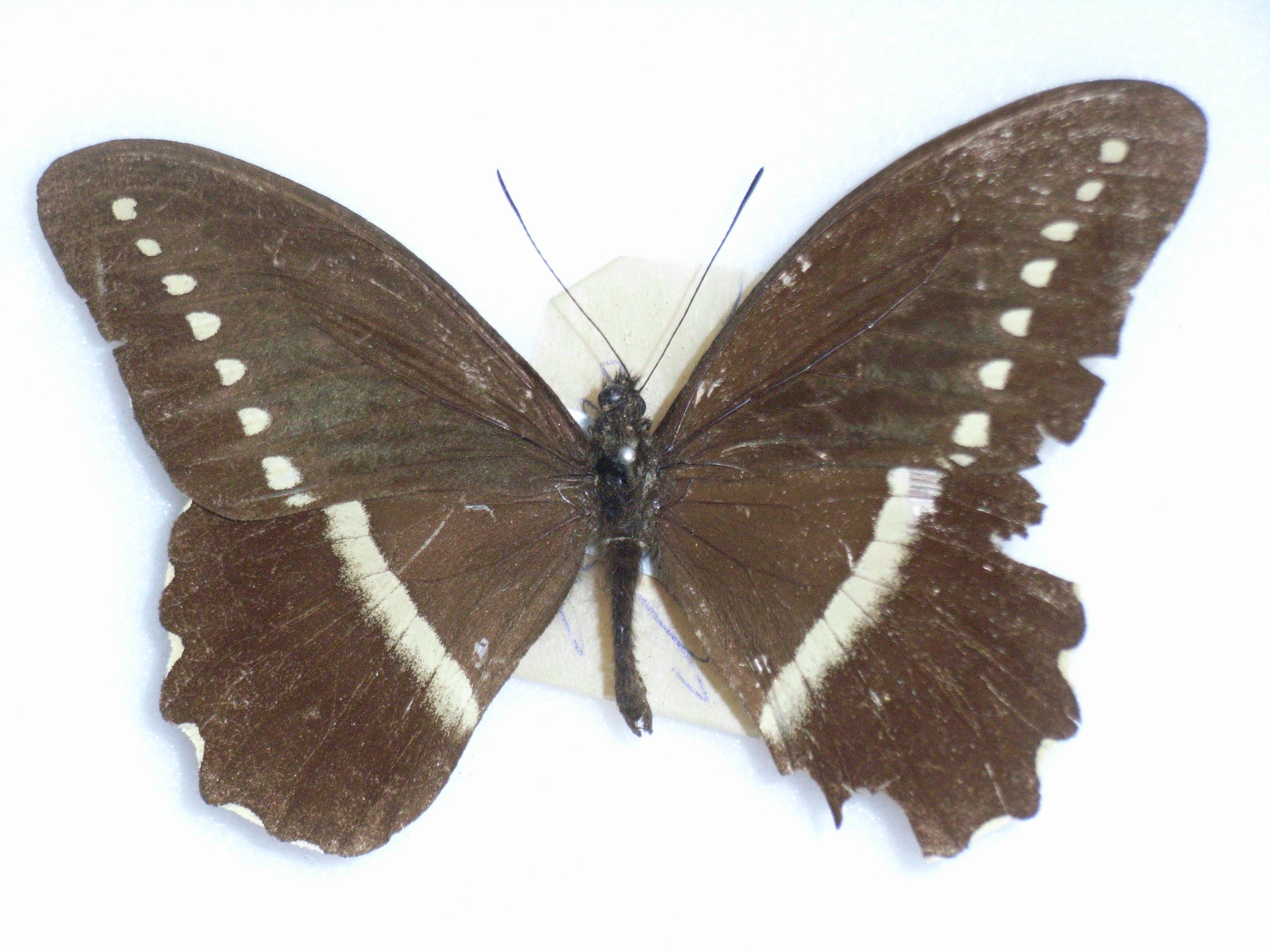
- Butterfly: Kilimanjaro Swallowtail

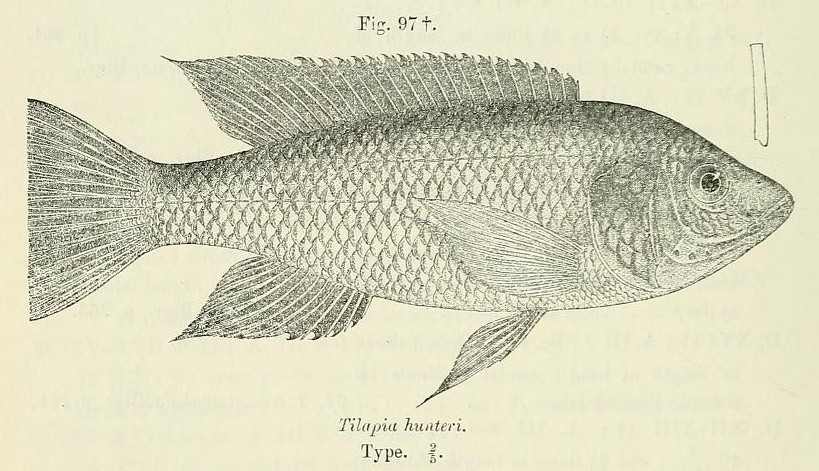
- Fish: Lake Chala tilapia

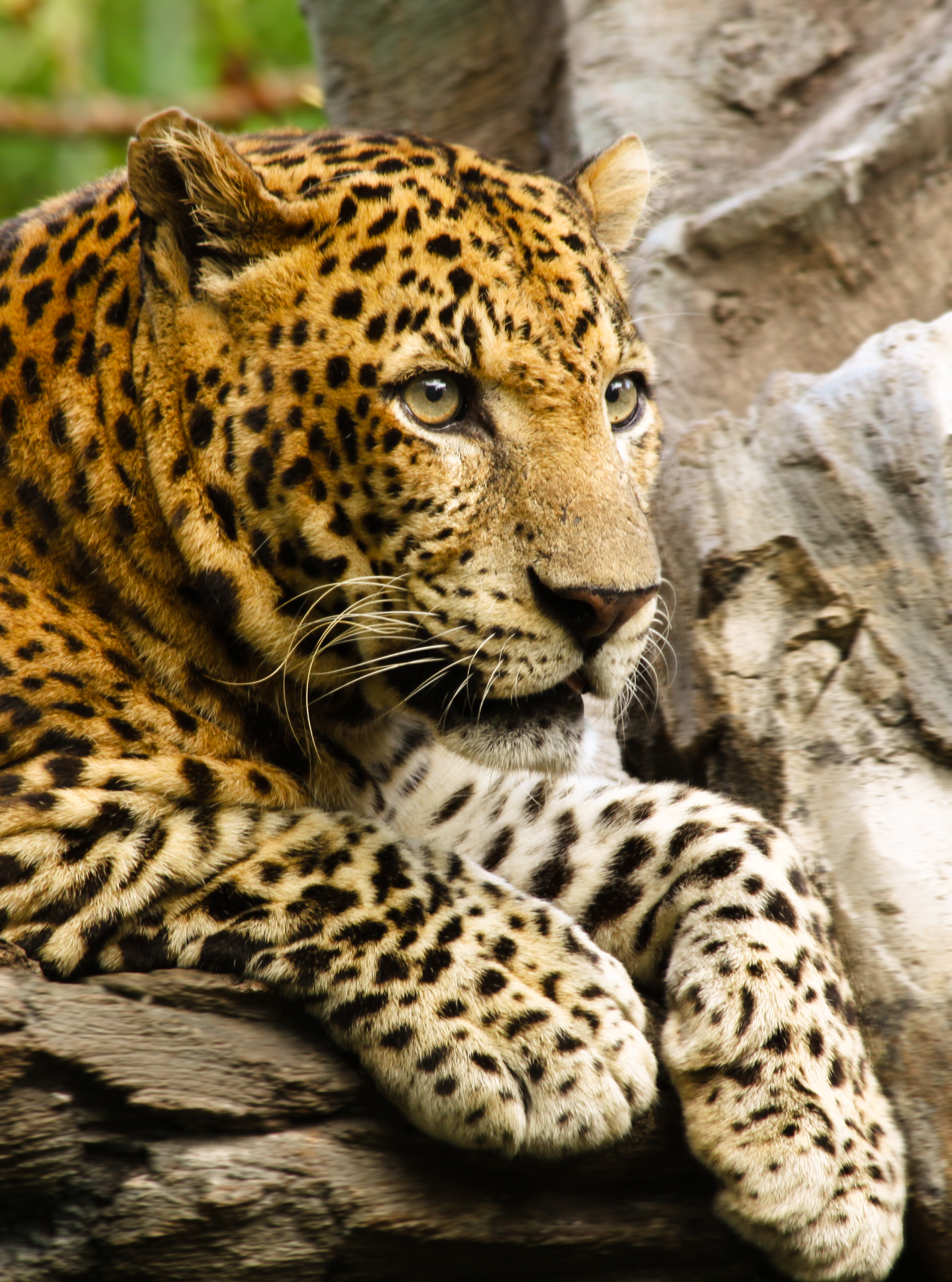
- Mammal: Leopard

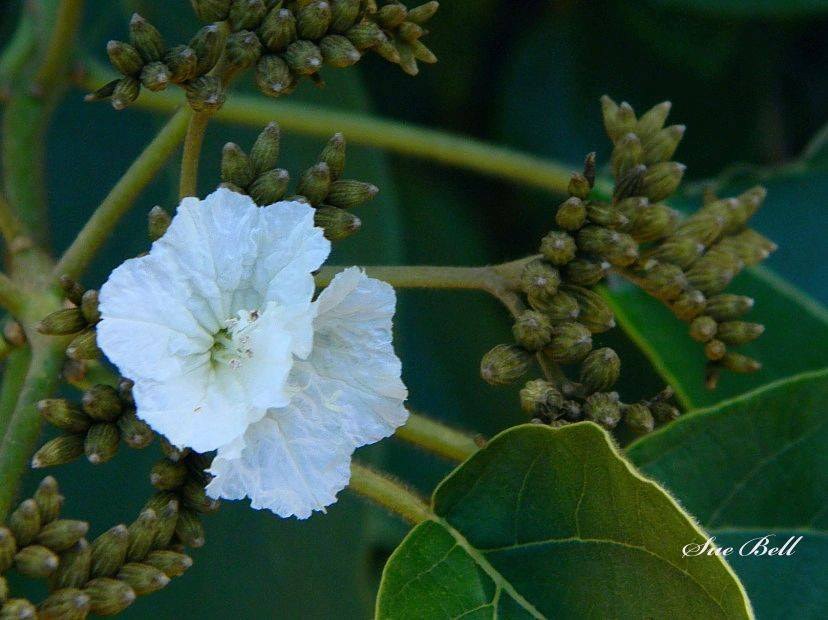
- Tree: Cordia africana

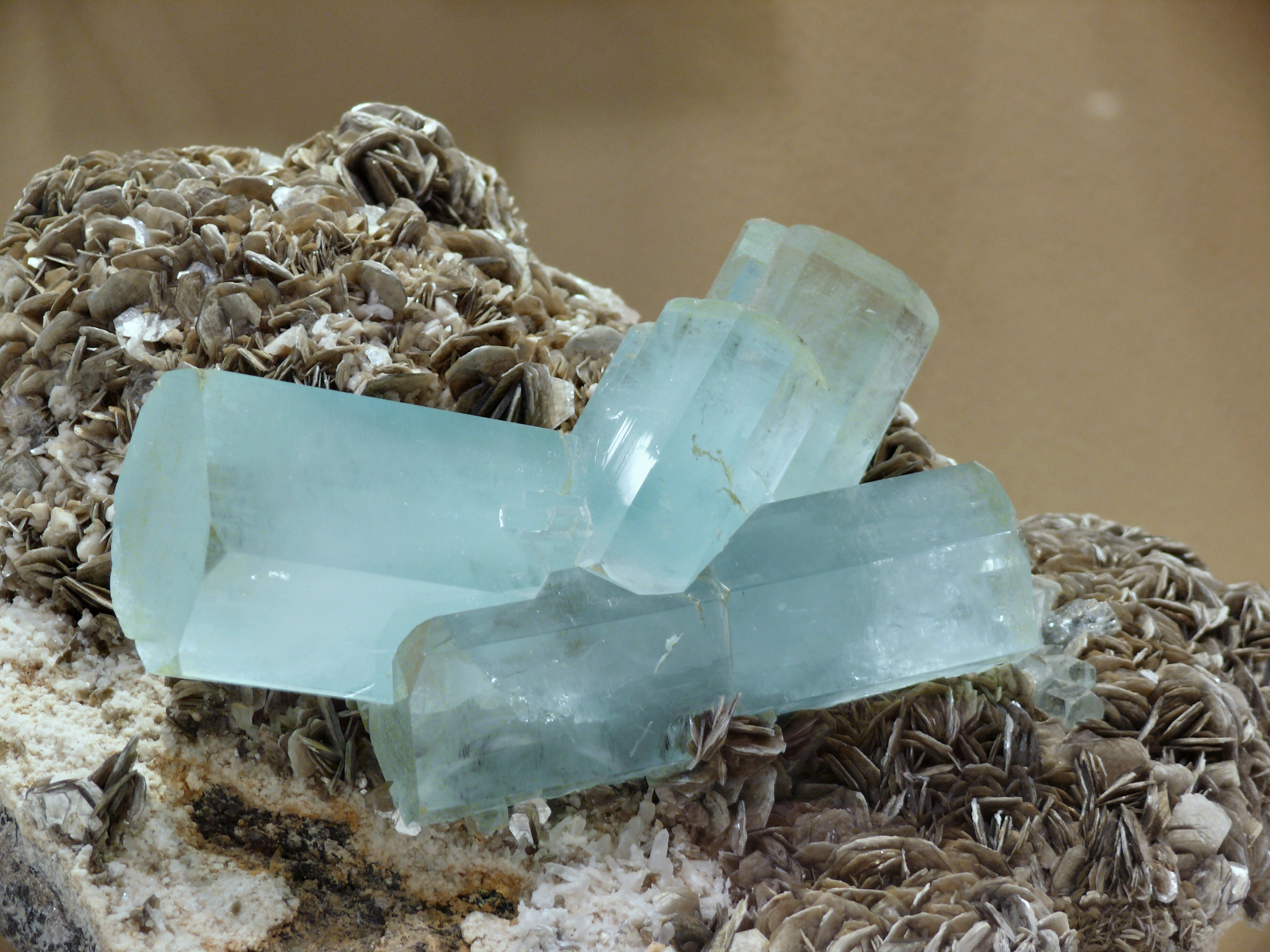
- Mineral: Aquamarine

Kilimanjaro Region (Swahili: Mkoa wa Kilimanjaro) is one of Tanzania's 31 administrative regions. The regional capital and largest city is the municipality of Moshi. With the 3rd highest HDI of 0.640 in the country, Kilimanjaro is one among the top five most developed regions of Tanzania. According to the 2012 national census, the region had a population of 1,640,087, which was lower than the pre-census projection of 1,702,207. For 2002–12, the region's 1.8% average annual population growth rate was the 24th highest in the country. It was also the eighth most densely populated region with 124 people per square kilometer. The most well-known tribes in the Kilimanjaro region are the Chaga.

The region forms part of the Northern Tourism Circuit in Tanzania. It is home to the Kilimanjaro National Park (which contains Mount Kilimanjaro), the Mkomazi National Park, the Pare Mountains, Lake Jipe, and Lake Chala. The region is bordered to the north and east by Kenya, to the south by the Tanga Region, to the southwest by the Manyara Region, and to the west by the Arusha Region.

== Etymology ==
In the early 19th century, the Swahili already referred to the mountain as "Kilima Ndsharo" (or "Dscharo"), "The Country of Dschagga," near the coast. In 1848 and 1849, Rebmann said the mountain Swahili names mean "Great Mountain" and "the Mountain of the Caravans" in reference to the mountain that could be seen for a long distance and served as a guide for travelers. He and Krapf found that the term was referred to differently by several nearby populations: the Taita just shortened the coastal Swahili word to "Ndscharo." It was known as "Kima ja Jeu," which is Kamba for "Mountain of Whiteness." It was known as "Ol Donyo Eibor," which is Maasai for "White Mountain." The Chagga themselves, especially the Kilema and Machame, simply called it "Kibo". Kilimandscharo, which Rebmann spelled in German between 1848 and 1849, was changed to "Kilimanjaro" by 1860.

== Administrative divisions ==
=== Districts ===
Kilimanjaro Region is divided into one city and six districts, each administered by a council, except Moshi District which has two, one of which serves as the capital of the region.

Districts of Kilimanjaro Region
Map with main roads in green	District	Population (2012 Census)	Population (2017 Estimates)
	Moshi District	466,737	509,431
	Moshi Municipal	184,292	201,150
	Hai District	210,533	229,791
	Siha District	116,313	126,953
	Rombo District	260,963	284,834
	Mwanga District	131,442	143,466
	Same District	269,807	294,487
	Total	1,640,087	1,790,113

== History ==
Kilimanjaro Region was officially established in 1963 with two districts: Kilimanjaro and Pare. The region was part of the Northern Province in the pre-independence Tanganyika. Northern Province's districts included Arusha and Mbulu, while Pare District was a part of Tanga Province.

Of the region's six districts, four traditionally had Chagga settlements, which are Hai District, Moshi District, Rombo District, and Siha District. The other two, Mwanga District and Same District, have historically included Pare settlements. However, during colonial rule in the late 19th century to the middle of the 20th century, the region was divided into two main districts: Moshi district, which was composed of all the areas settled by the Chagga people on the slopes of the mountain, and Pare district, which was a Pare tribe settlement. The region, from earlier times, had been settled by the people collectively called the Chagga, the Maasai, Wakwavi, and Waarusha (in the lower parts of Mount Kilimanjaro), and the Pare on the Pare mountains. These have been intermingling, trading, and even fighting from time to time for various socio-political reasons. Later, other tribes also migrated to the area.

Addendum: Prior to the abolition of traditional Chagga states, several distinct chiefdoms existed in the Kilimanjaro area. For instance, the Mmari dynasty ruled over Siha in the 19th century, with the dynastic line ending around 1900 after German colonial interventions. Another notable polity, the Kingdom of Masama, emerged in 1951 and lasted until its dissolution in 1962 during the transition to the post-independence administration of Tanganyika.

== Geology ==
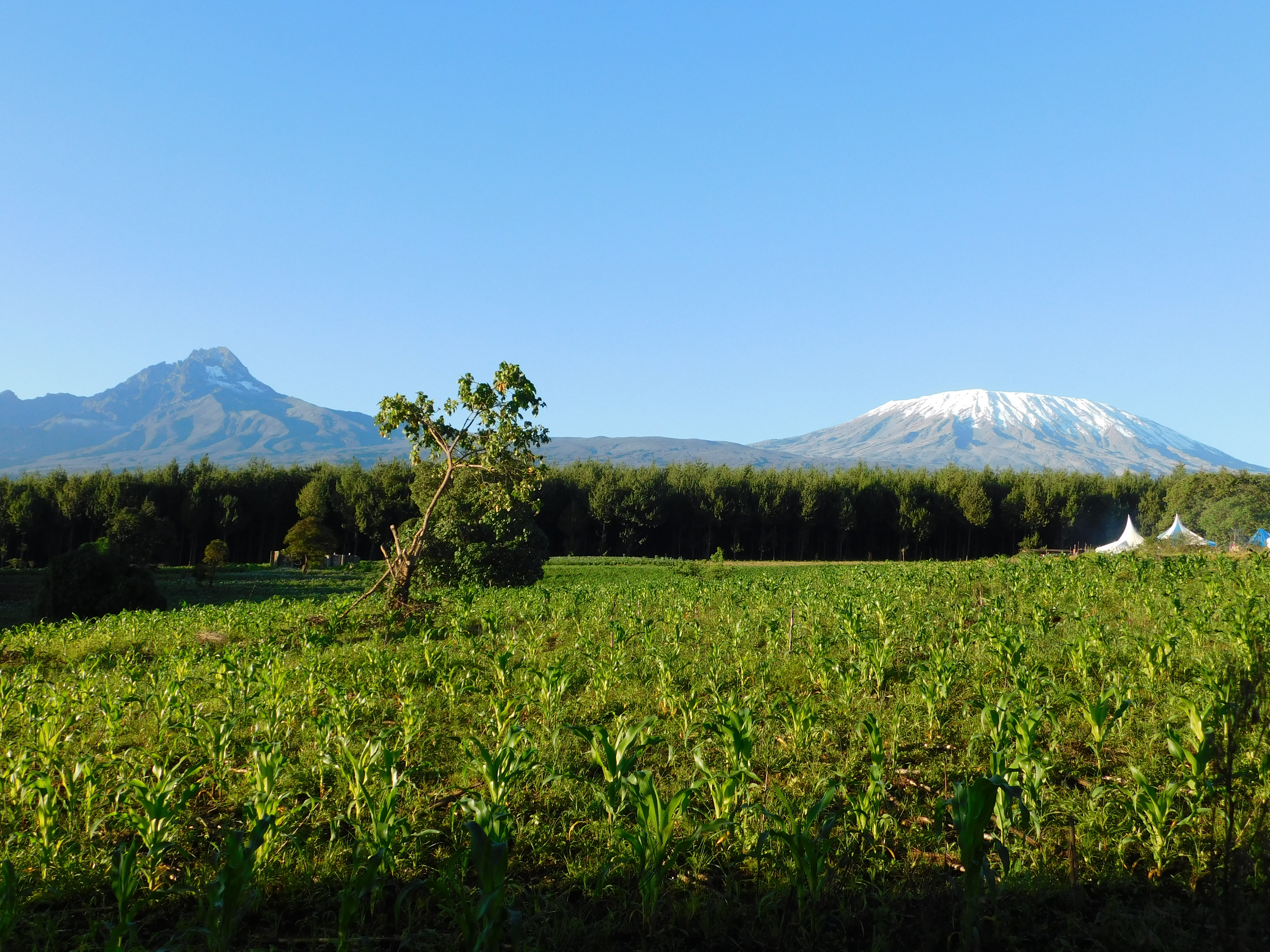
Mount Kilimanjaro

Mount Kilimanjaro lies on a tectonic plate line intersection 80 kilometres (50 mi) east of the tectonically active Rift Valley. It is part of a ‘Y’-shaped active continental rift system and formed as magma rose through fractures created by rifting that began in the Miocene, approximately 22–25 million years ago. The stratovolcano is composed of three overlapping volcanic cones—Shira, Mawenzi, and Kibo—and volcanic activity in its current form dates back less than a million years.

Steam and sulphur fumaroles here are indicative of residual activity. The summit features a caldera, and fumarolic activity occurs within nested summit craters, including around Reusch Crater, where vents emit gases at elevated temperatures.

At one stage, most of the summit of Kilimanjaro was covered by an ice cap, probably more than 100 metres (330 ft) deep. Glaciers extended well down the mountain forming moraine ridges, clearly visible now on the southern flanks down to about 4,000 metres (13,000 ft). At present only a small fraction of the glacial cover remains. For instance, the Rebmann Glacier, a remnant of this former ice cap, has lost approximately 82% of its ice cover between 1912 and 2000. Similarly, the Furtwängler Glacier has shrunk dramatically, with around 85% of its ice disappearing between October 1912 and June 2011; by 2018 its area had reduced to just 11,000 m². Other glaciers on Kilimanjaro—such as the Drygalski and Barranco glaciers—have vanished or exist only as disconnected remnants.

== Notable people ==
- Barnaba Classic, musician
- Scholastica Kimaryo, International civil servant, journalist, and life coach
- Abby Chams, singer
- Elieshi Lema, writer
- Freeman Mbowe, politician
- Lucas Mkenda, musician
- Cleopa Msuya, 3rd Tanzanian Prime Minister
- Flower Msuya, scientist
- Nathaniel Mtui, first Tanzanian historian
- Nandy, musician
- Maua Sama, musician
- Leonard Shayo, scholar and mathematician
- Bruno Tarimo, boxer
- Irene Tarimo, scientist

== See also ==
- Chagga people
- Kilimanjaro National Park
- Marangu
- Mkomazi National Park
- Moshi, Tanzania
- Pare people
- Pare Mountains
- Lake Chala
