= Kikuletwa Hot Springs =

Hot springs system in Kilimanjaro Region, Tanzania

- Maji Moto Hot Springs; Chemka Hot Springs
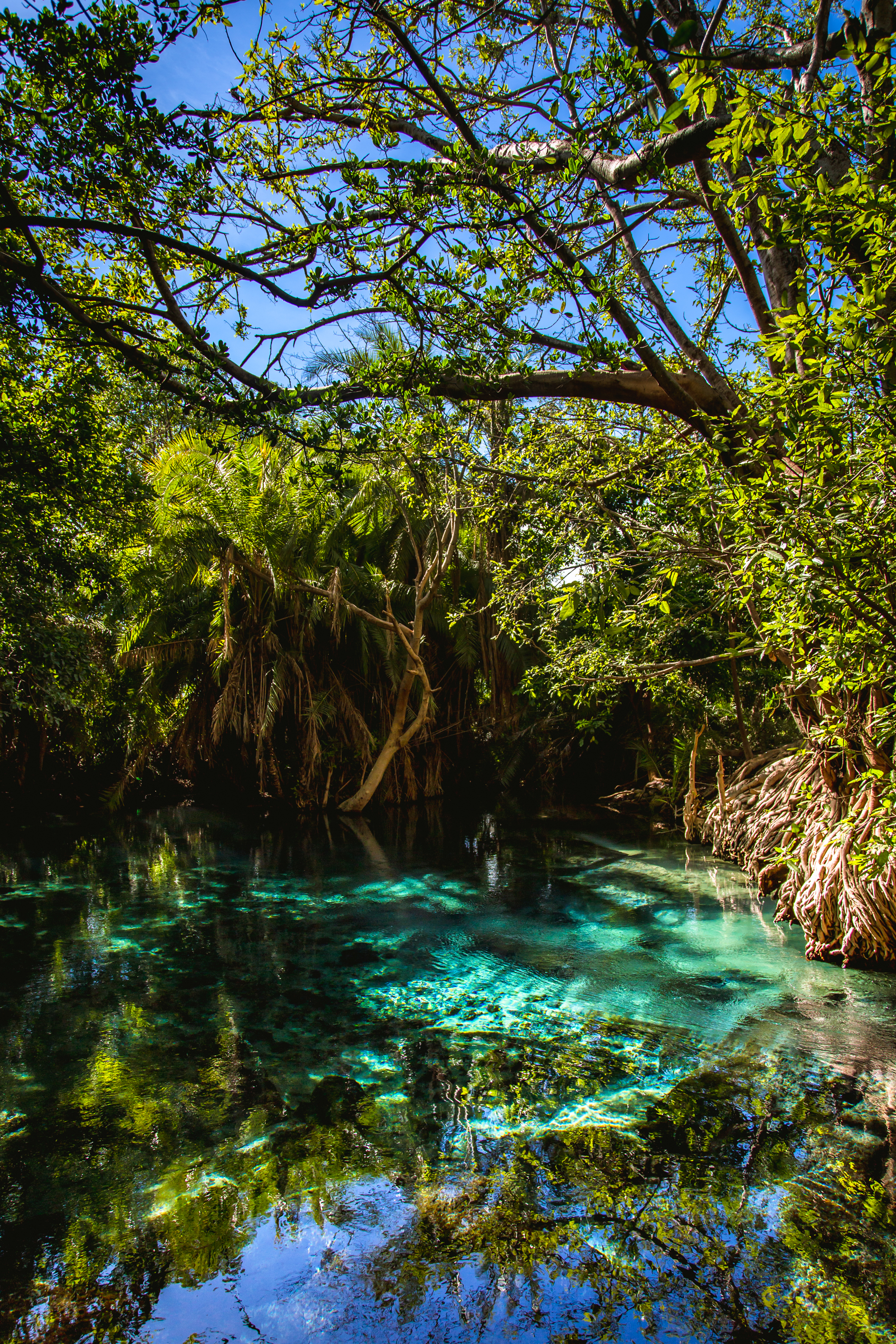
- Interactive map of Kikuletwa Hot Springs
- Location: Masama Rundugai, Hai District, Kilimanjaro Region. Tanzania
- Coordinates: 3°26′39.48″S 37°11′37.68″E
- Type: geothermal
- Temperature: 27 °C (81 °F)

Kikuletwa Hot Springs, also known as Maji Moto (Swahili: Maji Moto ya Kikuletwa) and also Chemka Hot Springs, is a natural geothermal oasis located in Masama Rundugai ward of Hai District in the Kilimanjaro region of Tanzania. Chemka means "boiling" in Swahili, referring to the appearance of how the water emerges from the ground. The hot springs are located approximately 40 kilometers from the town of Moshi, which is a gateway to Mount Kilimanjaro in a village called Chemka. The hot spring waters flow into the Kikuletwa River and eventually find its way to the Pangani River.

Historically, the Chagga people regarded the site as sacred.

The hot springs are situated in a lush and tranquil environment, surrounded by palm trees and other tropical vegetation. The water is clear and the temperature is around 27°C (81°F), ideal for swimming and relaxing. It can be as deep as 6 to 10 meters.

Kikuletwa Hot Springs is a popular destination for tourists and locals alike, who come to enjoy the natural beauty and serenity of the location. The area is also a popular spot for birdwatching, as there are many species of birds that inhabit the surrounding forests and wetlands. Cat fish and Red garra, that eat the dead skin off the feet of visitors, can be found in the water.

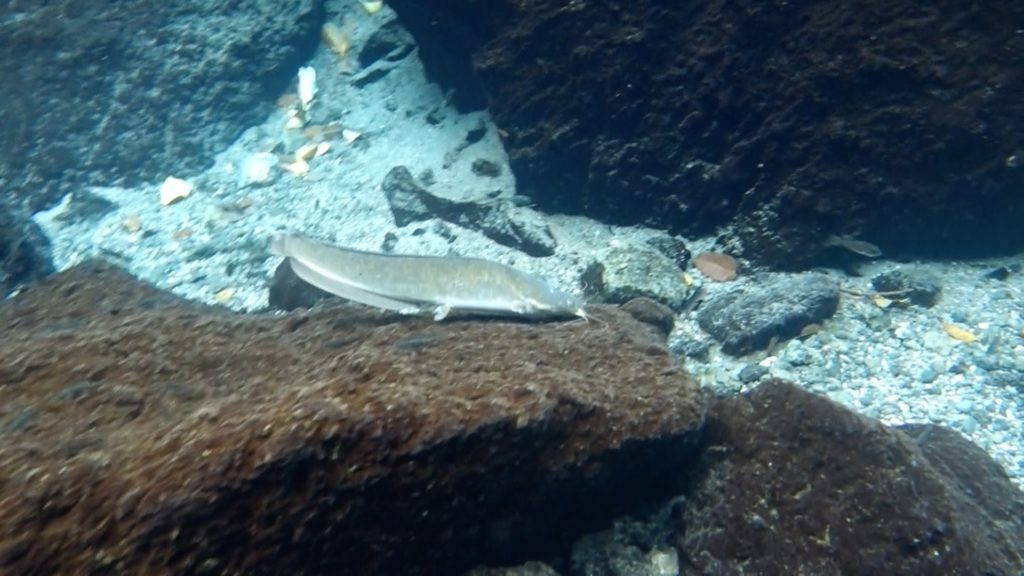
Cat fish at Kikuletwa hot springs

== Access ==
Visitors can reach Kikuletwa Hot Springs by car, and there are several tour operators that offer guided tours to the area. Access by Tuk Tuk is also possible from the nearby town of Boma Ng’ombe The hot springs are open year-round, and there is sometimes a small entrance fee to access the site. A souvenir shop and restaurant and bar are located nearby. Camping is also available.

== See also ==
List of hot springs
