= 1st Cornwall (Duke of Cornwall's) Artillery Volunteers =

British military unit

1st Cornwall (Duke of Cornwall's) Artillery Volunteers Cornwall Royal Garrison Artillery 523rd (Cornwall) Coast Regiment, RA 409 (Cornwall) Coast Regiment, RA
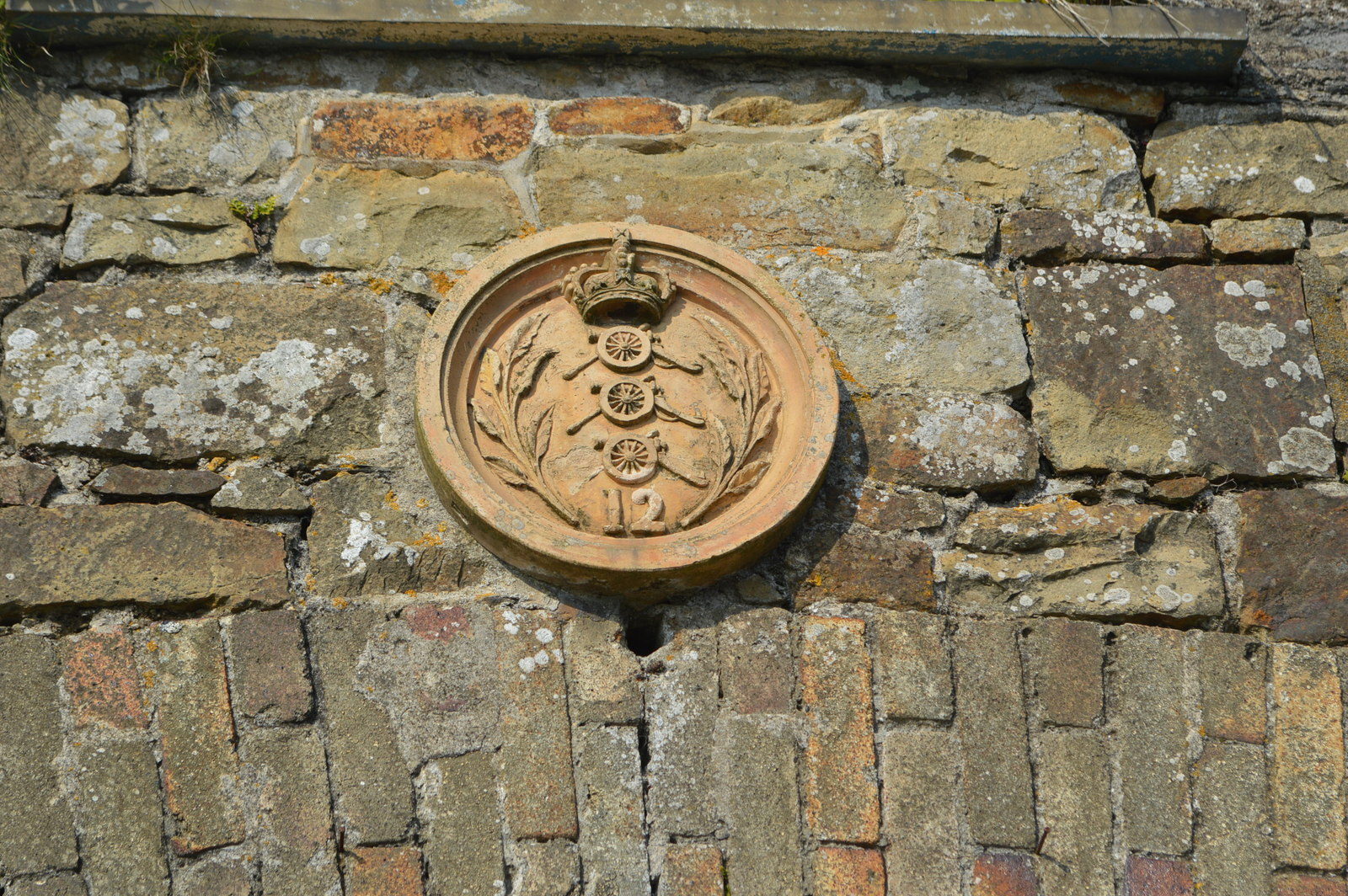
- Badge of the Cornwall Artillery Volunteers on the Drill Hall of the 12th (Marazion) Corps, c1870
- Active: 1859–1932; 1940–1956
- Country: United Kingdom
- Branch: Territorial Army
- Type: Artillery Regiment
- Role: Garrison Artillery; Coastal Artillery
- Garrison/HQ: Falmouth

The 1st Cornwall (Duke of Cornwall's) Artillery Volunteers were formed in 1860 as a response to a French invasion threat. They served as a Coast Artillery unit during both World Wars, and also manned batteries serving overseas. The unit continued in existence until the dissolution of Coast Artillery in the UK in 1956.

== Artillery Volunteers 1859–1908 ==
The Volunteer Force came into existence in 1859 as a result of an invasion scare and the consequent enthusiasm for joining local Rifle, Artillery and Engineer Volunteer Corps. By 24 May 1860, there were enough Artillery Volunteer Corps (AVCs) in Cornwall to form an Administrative Brigade with its Headquarters (HQ) at Bodmin to include all the AVCs in the county. From July 1861 the 1st Admin Brigade of Cornwall Artillery Volunteers appeared in the Army List under the title of The Duke of Cornwall's Artillery Volunteers, for which Queen Victoria gave special permission. The brigade had the following composition:

- 1st (Padstow) Cornwall AVC, raised 27 September 1859
- 2nd (Looe) Cornwall AVC, raised 17 October 1859
- 3rd (Fowey) Cornwall AVC, raised 25 November 1859
- 4th (Charlestown) Cornwall AVC, raised 30 October 1859
- 5th (Par) Cornwall AVC, raised 23 December 1859 as the '1st Section of Cornwall Artillery Volunteers'; became 5th Corps in March 1860 – Consols Mine
- 6th (Par Harbour) Cornwall AVC, raised 4 February 1860 as the '2nd Section of Cornwall Artillery Volunteers'; became 6th Corps in June 1860, absorbed by 5th Corps in July 1860
- 7th (Polruan) Cornwall AVC, raised 27 February 1860
- 8th (Hayle Foundry) Cornwall AVC, raised from foundry workers 2 April 1860
- 9th (West Fowey Consols Mine) Cornwall AVC, raised from mineworkers on 2 April 1860; disbanded in late 1863
- 10th (St Buryan) Cornwall AVC, raised 5 November 1860; moved to Newlyn 1868, and to Penzance 1877
- 11th (St Ives) Cornwall AVC, raised 8 November 1860; disbanded 1878
- 12th (Marazion) Cornwall AVC, raised 3 April 1860
- 13th (St Just) Cornwall AVC, raised 26 September 1862

Lieutenant-Colonel W.R. Gilbert, a half-pay officer in the Royal Artillery (RA), was appointed to command the brigade on 24 May 1860. His second in command, Brevet Major Shadwell M. Grylls, was also a half-pay RA officer, while the adjutant, Captain Robert Edyvean, had previously been in the Royal Cornwall and Devon Miners Artillery Militia. Gilbert held the command for over 30 years. In May 1880, the Corps were consolidated as the 1st Cornwall (Duke of Cornwall's) Artillery Volunteers, with ten batteries distributed as follows:

- No 1 Battery at Padstow
- No 2 Battery at Looe
- No 3 Battery at Fowey
- No 4 Battery at Charlestown
- No 5 Battery at Par
- No 6 Battery at Polruan
- No 7 Battery at Hayle
- No 8 Battery at Penzance
- No 9 Battery at Marazion
- No 10 Battery at St Just

On 1 April 1882, all the AVCs were affiliated to one of the territorial garrison divisions of the RA and the 1st Cornwall AV became part of the Western Division. On 1 September 1886, it officially became the 3rd Volunteer (Duke of Cornwall's) Brigade, Western Division, RA, but resumed its former title three years later. In 1888, HQ moved to Falmouth. By 1893, the War Office Mobilisation Scheme had allocated the 1st Cornwall Artillery Volunteers to the Plymouth fixed defences.

In the 1890s, the battery at Polruan was disbanded, a new No 6 Battery was raised at Hayle in 1894 and the higher numbered batteries were renumbered 7–9. Thereafter, a new No 10 Battery was raised at Falmouth and Truro and No 11 Battery at Buryan and Newbridge. No 10 Battery had a drill shed at High Street, Falmouth.

=== Royal Garrison Artillery ===
In 1899, the RA was divided into separate field and garrison branches, and the artillery volunteers were all assigned to the Royal Garrison Artillery (RGA). On 1 January 1902, the RA's divisional organisation was abolished and the titles were changed, the unit becoming the 1st Cornwall (Duke of Cornwall's) Royal Garrison Artillery (Volunteers). Two further batteries were raised in the 1900s.

== Territorial Force ==
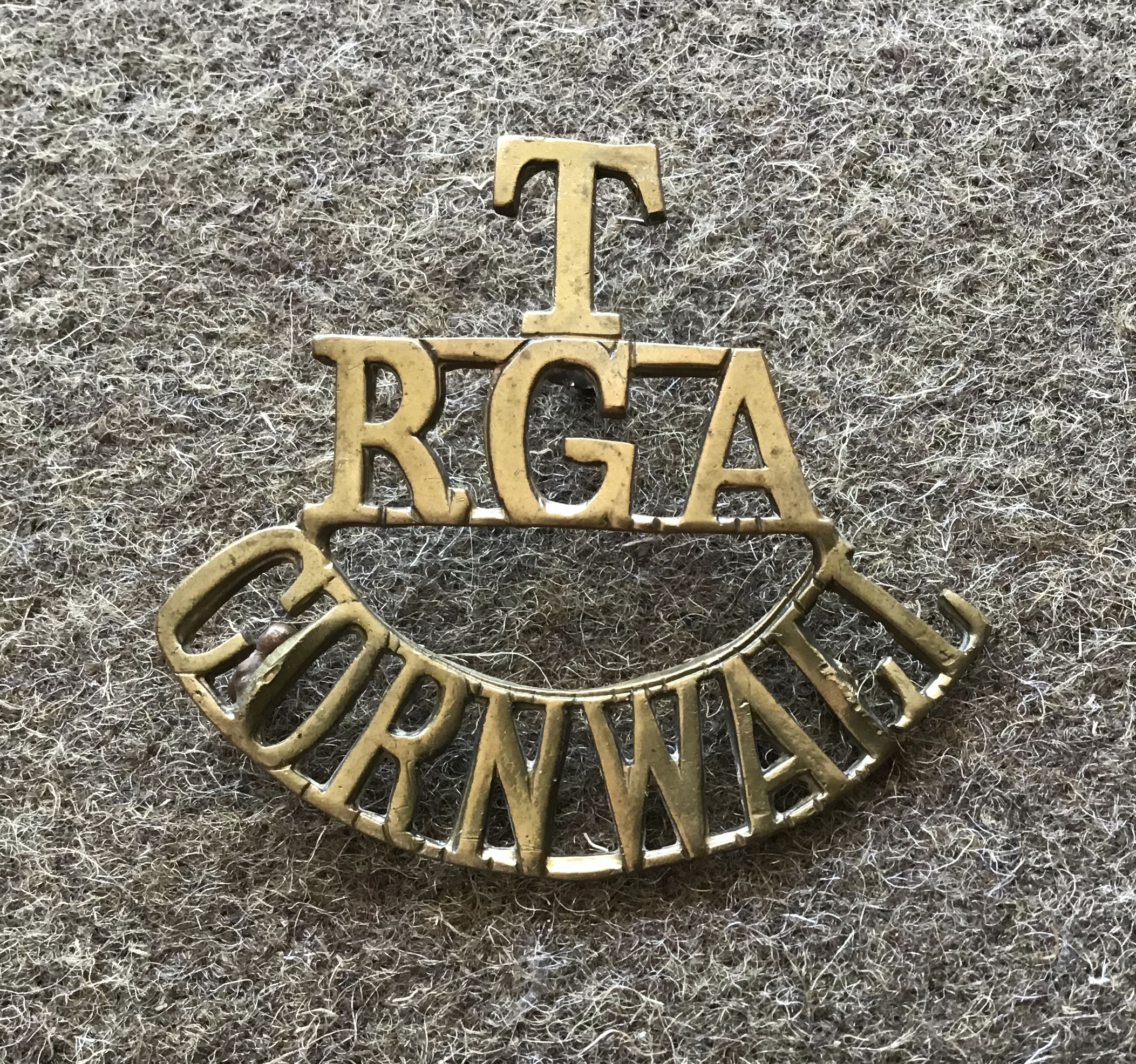
Unit shoulder title.

When the Territorial Force (TF) was created from the old Volunteer Force under the Haldane Reforms of 1908, the 1st Cornwall RGA (V) was to join with the Devonshire RGA (V) to become the Cornwall & Devon RGA, and also to provide a Cornwall Battery for the 3rd Wessex Brigade, Royal Field Artillery (RFA), but this was changed in 1910 to separate Cornwall and Devon units without the RFA battery. The Cornwall (Duke of Cornwall's) RGA had the following organisation:

- HQ at Bank Place, Falmouth
- No 1 Heavy Battery at Padstow
- No 2 Heavy Battery at Penzance
- No 3 Company at Looe
- No 4 Company at Marazion and Hayle
- No 5 Company at St Ives
- No 6 Company at Falmouth
- No 7 Company at Truro

The companies were responsible for manning the batteries of fixed coastal guns, while the heavy batteries were mobile and responsible for the landward defences (TF heavy batteries were usually armed with obsolescent 4.7-inch guns). In 1914, the Falmouth defences consisted of four 6-inch guns.

== World War I ==
=== Mobilisation ===
On the outbreak of war, the Cornwall RGA mobilised under the command of Lt-Col H. Shapcott, VD and deployed to its war stations guarding the major ports of Cornwall under No 1 Coastal Fire Command. No 1 Heavy Battery was commanded by Maj J.A. Cumberledge and No 2 Hvy Bty by Maj Francis Freathy Oats, son of the mining magnate Francis Oats, who had recruited many miners from his family's St Just mines into his battery. The group of smaller garrison companies were commanded by another major and the individual companies by captains.

Shortly afterwards, TF units were invited to volunteer for Overseas Service and, on 15 August 1914, the War Office (WO) issued instructions to separate those men who had signed up for Home Service only, and form these into reserve units. On 31 August, the formation of a reserve or 2nd Line unit was authorised for each 1st Line unit where 60 per cent or more of the men had volunteered for Overseas Service. The titles of these 2nd Line units would be the same as the original, but distinguished by a '2/' prefix. In this way duplicate companies and batteries were created, releasing the 1st Line units to be sent overseas. Recruitment for the Cornwall RGA went well: by January 1915, Maj Oats had recruited two additional batteries. A new 1/8th Company later served in the Plymouth defences.

By October 1914, the campaign on the Western Front was bogging down into Trench warfare and there was an urgent need for batteries of Heavy and Siege artillery to be sent to France. The WO decided that the TF coastal gunners were well enough trained to take over many of the duties in the coastal defences, releasing Regular RGA gunners for service in the field, and 1st line RGA companies that had volunteered for overseas service had been authorised to increase their strength by 50 per cent. In July 1915 1/1st and 1/2nd Heavy Btys of the Cornwall RGA manned 134th (Cornwall) Heavy Bty, RGA, officially formed at Woolwich on 17 August. The battery saw active service in the East African Campaign.

Although coast defence companies never left the UK, they did supply drafts of trained gunners to RGA units serving overseas. They also provided cadres as the basis on which to form complete new units for front line service. The cadres of the 46th, 93rd and 173rd Siege Batteries formed in 1915–16 were provided by the Cornwall RGA, while a number of other siege batteries formed later in the Falmouth Defences (211th, 246th, 266th, 296th) may have included trained men from the unit among the recruits, although the Army Council Instructions did not specifically order this. (Note: Information compiled on casualties listed on the Looe, Madron, Redruth and St Ives War Memorials suggests that 158th (Cornwall) Anti-Aircraft Section, 8th, O, Q and S Anti-Aircraft Batteries, 235th and 239th Siege Btys and 1/1st Highland (Fifeshire) Hvy Bty all included men from the Cornwall RGA.)

=== Home defence ===
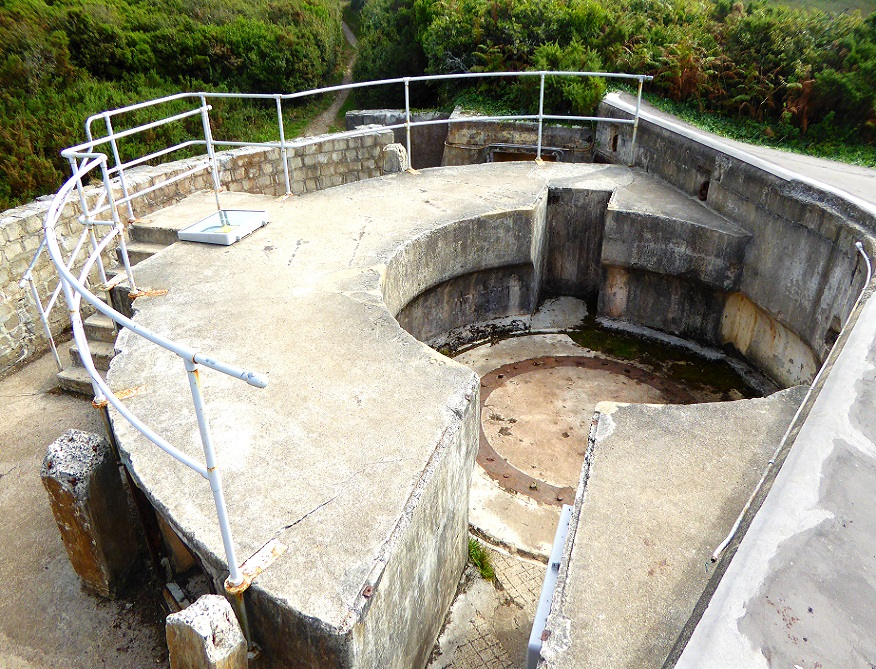
The excavated and restored eastern gun emplacement at Anthony Battery.

Under Army Council Instruction 686 of April 1917, the coast defence companies of the RGA (TF) were reorganised. The Cornwall RGA serving in the Falmouth garrison was reduced from eight companies (1/3rd, 1/4th, 1/5th, 1/6th, 1/7th, 2/4th, 2/6th and 2/7th) to just two (numbered 1 and 2), which were to be kept up to strength with Regular recruits. 1/8th Company disappeared into the reduced Devon RGA.

By April 1918, the Falmouth defences comprised the following batteries under the control of No 1 Coastal Fire Command:

- Pendennis Castle – 2 × 6-inch Mk VII guns
- St Anthony Battery – 2 × 6-inch Mk VII
- Hayle Powder Factory – 2 × 12-pdr QF guns

These defences never saw action during the war.

=== 134th (Cornwall) Heavy Battery ===
134th (Cornwall) Heavy Bty was formed in July 1915 by 1/1st and 1/2nd Heavy Btys of the Cornwall RGA. It embarked for the East African Campaign on 26 December 1915, arriving at Mombasa on 1 February 1916. It was equipped with four Indian Army pattern 5.4-inch howitzers, which were drawn by oxen, but it had a motor transport company (No 633, Army Service Corps) as its ammunition column.

In March, the battery took part in the Battle of Latema Nek, and later in a long march along the Pangani River, reaching Morogoro by late August. Here, the offensive was halted by rain, exhaustion and German defences, so the force paused and reorganised. On 1 January 1917 the battery opened fire from prepared positions to support the attack on the Mgeta river, suppressing the fire of enemy machine guns commanding the bridge but losing one of its howitzers to a premature shell burst.

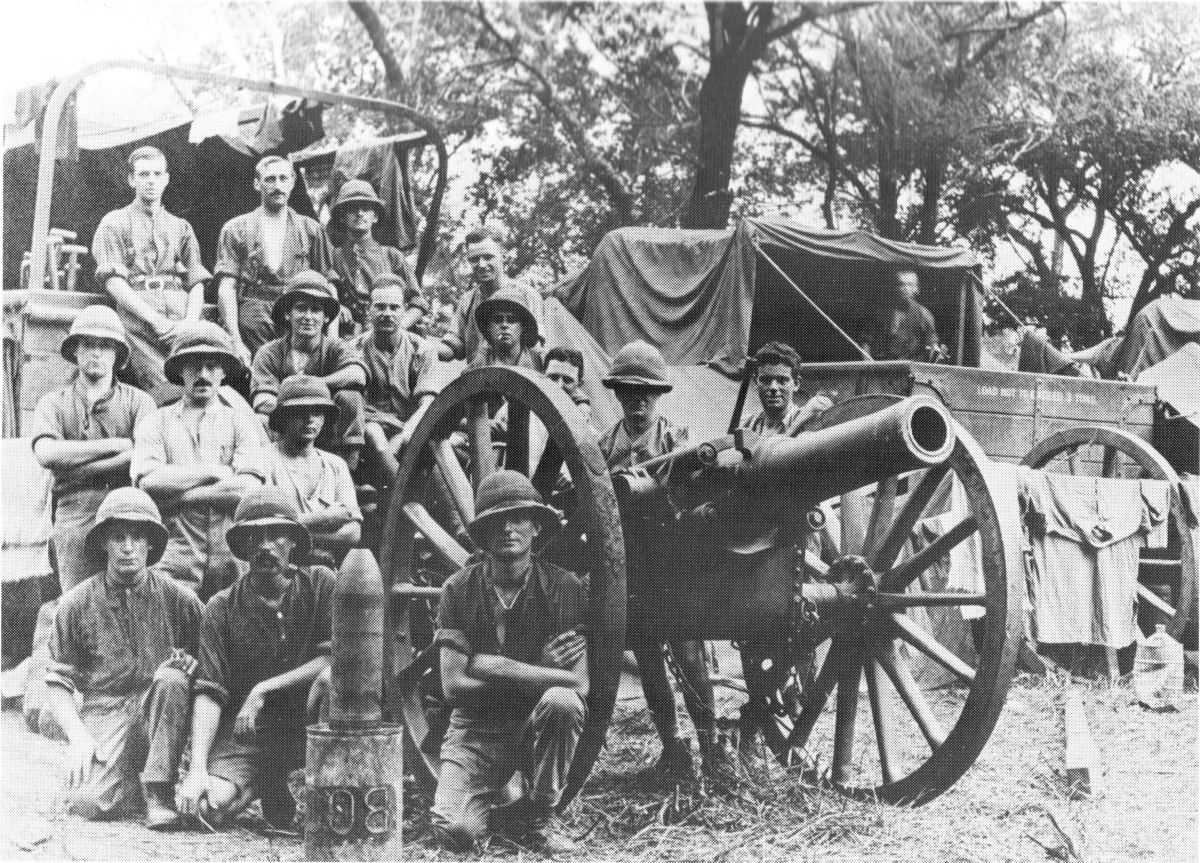
5.4-inch howitzer and crew at Morogoro, 1916–17.

In February 1917, the battery sent a howitzer and its detachment by sea to join the defences of Lindi while the rest of the battery returned to Morogoro for training. At the end of May, the battery handed its two remaining 5.4-inch howitzers over to 11th (Hull) Heavy Bty and took over a 5-inch howitzer from that battery. It then joined the detachment at Lindi, where it adapted Flat wagons so that a howitzer and its limber could be moved along the German light railway, hauled by local porters.

The Lindi Column began probing forward in August, with the battery's howitzer shelling Tandimuti Hill in conjunction with Royal Navy monitors firing from offshore. Until mid-September, the 5-inch and 5.4-inch howitzers engaged in shoots on Narunyu on the bank of the Lukuledi River while the Lindi Column waited for reinforcements, including another 5-inch howitzer from Morogoro and the battery's lorries. Between 23 and 25 September, while the battery bombarded the enemy positions on the Lukuledi, a flanking column manoeuvred the Germans out. The pursuit was slow: the roads were impassable for lorries, so the howitzers had to be dragged forward by porters. From 5 October, the battery bombarded the high ground across the Nyengedi River, exchanging fire with a German gun, until the column obtained a bridgehead. Between 15 and 18 October, the Lindi Column fought the Battle of Mahiwa, one of the bloodiest battles of the whole campaign, with the battery firing in support of the failed attack. However, the Germans had also lost heavily, and retired into Portuguese Mozambique where they split up into guerrilla columns.

In December, the Lindi force was broken up and its exhausted and sickly British units went home. On 19 December 1917, 134th (Cornwall) Heavy Battery embarked from Dar es Salaam for England.

=== 546th Siege Battery ===
The veterans of 134th (Cornwall) Hvy Bty were then reorganised into 546th Siege Battery on 27 February 1918. This was one of only two TF siege batteries formed during the war, the other being the 309th formed by the Honourable Artillery Company (93rd and 173rd Siege Batteries (see below) were formally New Army units). The 546th was also the last RGA siege battery to be sent overseas during World War I, reaching the Western Front on 22 August 1918. Equipped with four 6-inch guns it served with Second Army until the Armistice with Germany. It was apparently disbanded before the end of 1918. (Note: Veterans from 13th Hvy Bty in 546th Siege Bty probably included Gnr Joseph Prowse, named on St Buryan War Memorial and Cpl Richard Gardner from Cornwall,)

=== 46th Siege Battery ===
46th Siege Battery, RGA, was formed at Tynemouth on 30 July 1915 with a number of gunners drawn from Nos 12 and 47 Companies, RGA, of the Tynemouth garrison in North East Coast Defences. Meanwhile, on 10 August a cadre of three officers and 78 other ranks( ORs) – the establishment of a TF garrison company – from the Cornwall RGA, led by Captain A.W. Gill, officer commanding (OC) No 7 Co at Truro, travelled from Falmouth to the RGA camp at Lydd, where they were joined by the Tynemouth contingent on 16 August. The battery went to France on 20 October equipped with four 9.2-inch howitzers and joined Third Army at Authie in the Somme sector. RGA batteries with the BEF were regularly switched between brigades (later Heavy Artillery Groups, HAGs).

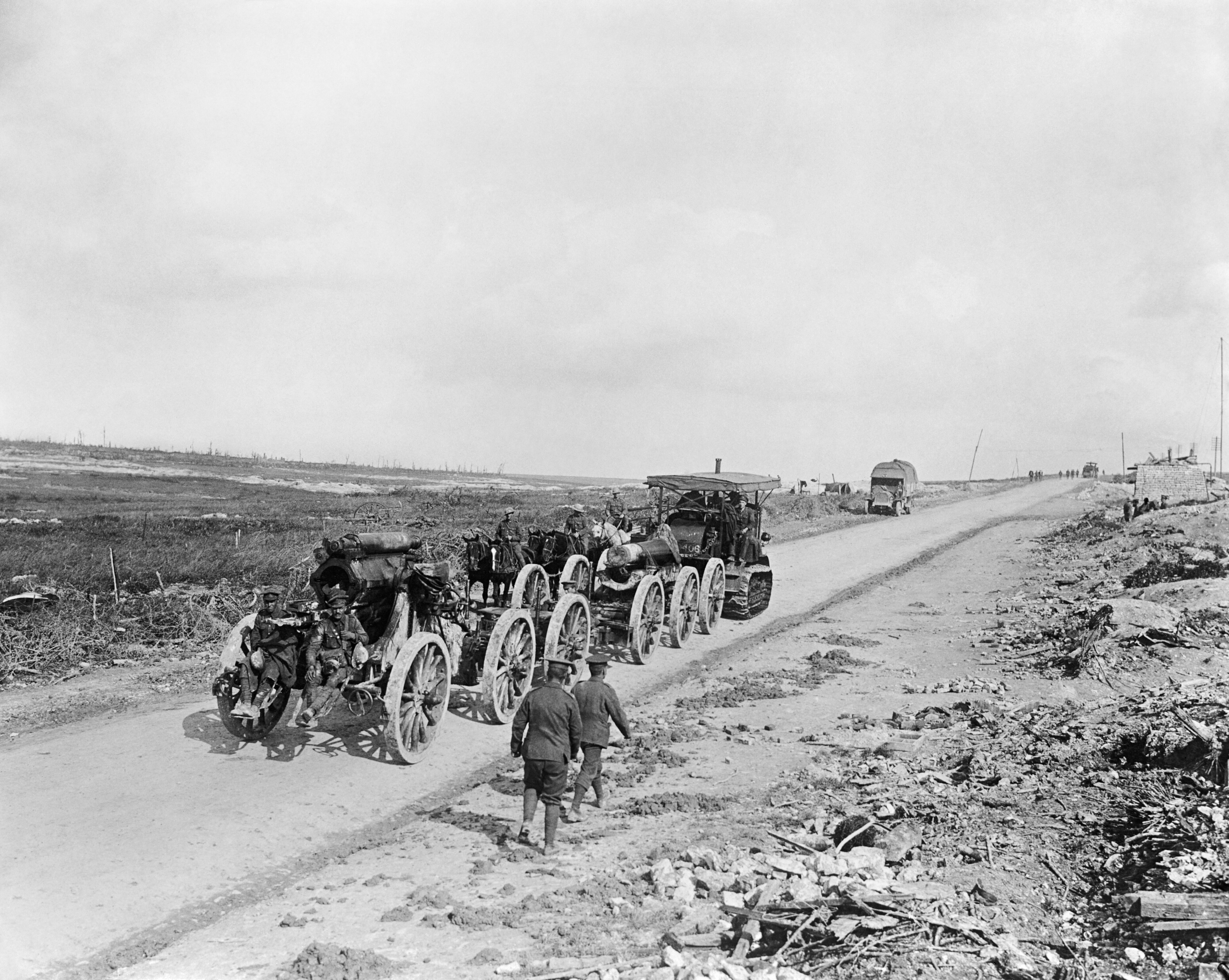
A Holt caterpillar tractor hauling a 9.2-inch howitzer on the Somme, summer 1916.

Fourth Army took over the sector for 1916's 'Big Push' (the Battle of the Somme) and the battery supported X Corps' disastrous attacks on Beaumont-Hamel and Serre on the First day on the Somme (1 July). 46th Siege Bty later covered the final attacks of the Somme offensive. When the Germans retreated to the Hindenburg Line in early 1917, it was switched back to Third Army for the Arras Offensive in April. In August, it supported Canadian Corps for the Battle of Hill 70, which was a diversion from the fighting at the Third Battle of Ypres.

In September, the battery returned to X Corps, now with Second Army for the Autumn attacks at Ypres. The Battles of the Menin Road, Polygon Wood and Broodseinde were highly successful because of the weight of artillery brought to bear on German positions. But, as the offensive continued with the Battle of Poelcappelle and First and Second Battles of Passchendaele, the tables were turned: British batteries were clearly observable from the Passchendaele Ridge and were subjected to Counter-battery fire, while their own guns sank into the mud and became difficult to aim and fire. When the battery was finally rested in November it took six days to pull out its guns in the mud and under shellfire.

By now, HAG allocations were becoming more fixed, and during December 1917 they were converted into permanent RGA brigades once more. For the rest of the war, the battery was the heavy element in 19th (9.2-inch Howitzer) Brigade, RGA.

When the Germans launched their Spring Offensive in March 1918, this was restricted in the Arras sector to heavy bombardment. This included severe gas shelling of Feuchy, where 46th Siege Bty was emplaced, and the battery was ordered to move back. On 28 March, a new phase of the German offensive was launched against Arras itself, but 46th Siege Bty back in its new position escaped the shelling. As the infantry battle moved closer, 19th Bde was ordered to pull back, and 46th Siege Bty gave up its positions to another battery, parking its 9.2-inch howitzers behind Arras. However, the attack on Arras failed and, on 30 March, 46th Siege Bty was ordered to return to join in 19th Bde's retaliatory fire.

The Allied launched their Hundred Days Offensive on 8 August. Third Army joined in at the Battle of Albert on 21 August, and the Battle of the Scarpe, beginning on 26 August. But, as the Germans retreated, the heavy 9.2-inch batteries got left behind. 46th Siege Bty supported the Canadian attack on the Drocourt-Quéant Switch Line (2 September) and the Battle of the Canal du Nord (27 September), but was parked when the Armistice with Germany came into force on 11 November.

Postwar demobilisation saw 46th Siege Bty reduced to cadre strength. In 1919, it was sent to Ireland where it merged with another battery to form a new 46th Bty, RGA. Later redesignated 19th Medium Bty, this served in the Regular Army until 1943.

=== 93rd Siege Battery ===
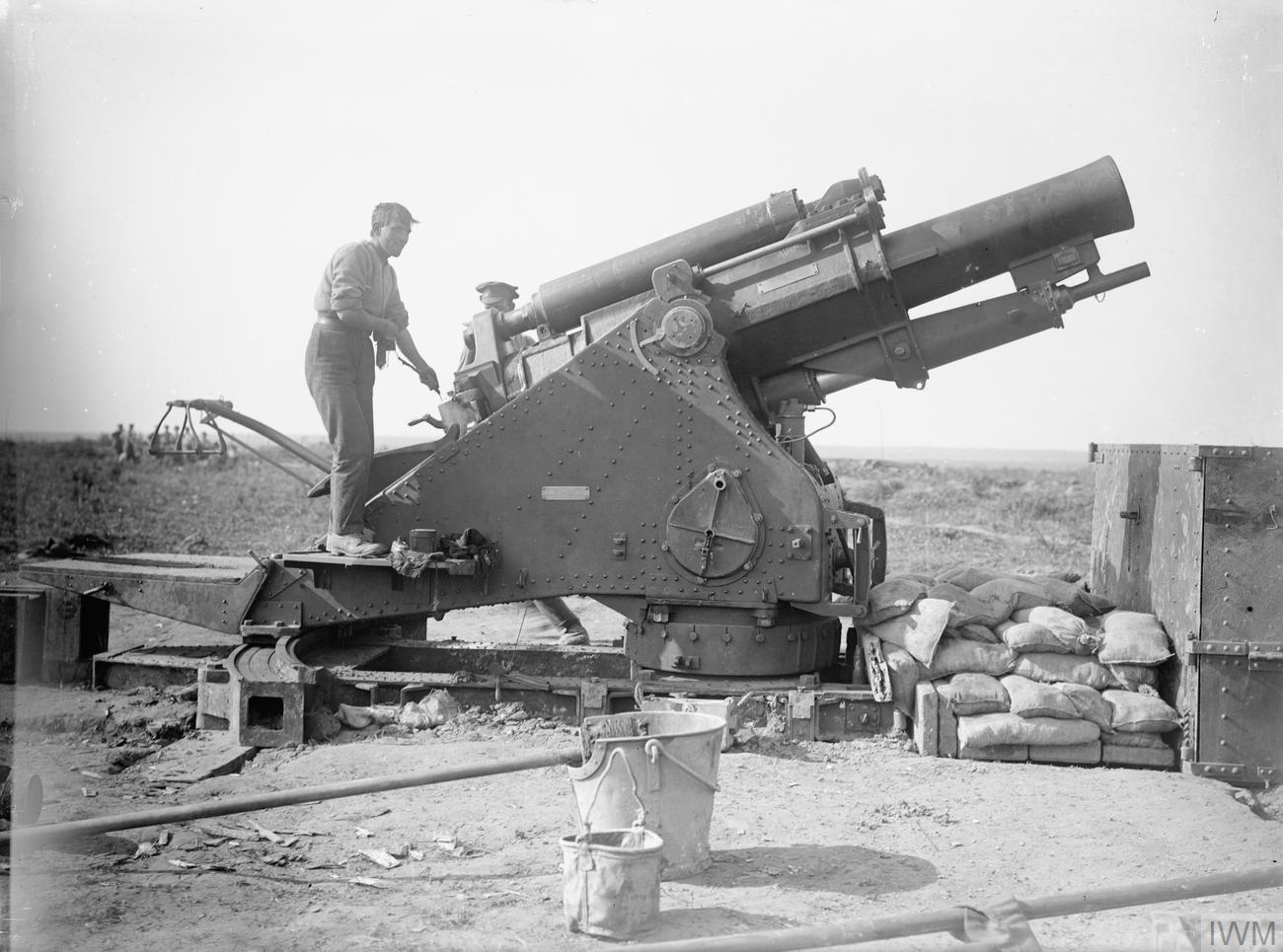
9.2-inch howitzer in action on the Somme, 1916.

93rd Siege Battery was formed at Plymouth under War Office Instruction 181 of 16 December 1915 from a cadre of three officers and 78 ORs supplied by the Cornwall RGA. It was equipped with four 9.2-inch howitzers and left for the Western Front on 5 May.

On 29 May, the battery was assigned to 35th HAG with Third Army, supporting the Attack on the Gommecourt Salient on the first day of the Battle of the Somme. Ammunition was short and because of poor weather for observation the attack was postponed for two days; the lack of ammunition resulted in a reduced rate of fire over the additional days. At 07.28 on Z Day (1 July), two minutes before H Hour, the heavy howitzers lifted onto their targets in the German support and reserve lines as the infantry got out of their forward trenches and advanced towards Gommecourt. The attack was initially successful, the leading waves getting into the first German trench and some parties entering the second line. But they were hit by enfilade fire and unsuppressed German artillery prevented the follow-up waves and ammunition carrying parties from crossing No man's land. There was little that the battery could do to help: communication with its Forward Observation Officer (FOO) was broken for most of the day, and it had few shells left. The survivors of the attack were back on their start line by the end of the day.

The Gommecourt attack had only been a diversion for the main attack and it was not renewed. Third Army was not involved in any major operations for the rest of the year. 93rd Siege Bty remained with Third Army, moving between HAGs as required. In December, it came under Fifth Army, which carried out a series of small Operations on the Ancre, January–March 1917, and on the fringe of the Arras Offensive.

In July, the battery switched to Second Army in the Ypres Salient, supporting the Third Ypres Offensive. This made little progress until Second Army took over its direction for the battles from the Menin Road to Passchendaele, when it bogged down in the mud. On 14 December, the battery was joined by a section from 183rd Siege Bty, bringing it up to a strength of six howitzers with 69th HAG. By now, HAG allocations were becoming more fixed and, on 1 February 1918, the 69th was converted into a permanent RGA brigade. The battery stayed with 69th Bde until the Armistice a year later.

69th Brigade was with Fifth Army when was attacked on 21 March 1918, the first day of the German Spring Offensive. FOOs were blinded by early morning mist and many were overrun along with the infantry in the forward zone. The German bombardment was savage. Some heavy artillery units were caught in the fighting or forced to abandon their guns as the Germans advanced rapidly. Over the following days, the RGA struggled to get their guns back during the 'Great Retreat'.

The Allied Hundred Days Offensive opened with Fourth Army's attack at the Amiens at 04.20 on 8 August. 69th Brigade supported the Australian Corps on whose front the heavy artillery barrage was so thick and accurate that all the Australian objectives were secured. On 29 September, Fourth Army's IX Corps carried out an assault crossing of the St Quentin Canal, with 69th Bde in support. The heavy guns continued firing on the canal banks until the last possible moment as the infantry scrambled across in the morning mist.

On 8 October, IX Corps stormed the Beaurevoir Line, again supported by 69th Bde. The Battle of the Selle began on 17 October, with one German counter-attack being broken up when all available guns were turned onto it. IX Corps renewed its advance on 23 October, with 69th Bde part of a massive corps artillery reserve. The attack went in under moonlight, after the heavy guns had done their work. As the regimental historian relates, "The guns of Fourth Army demonstrated, on 23rd October, the crushing effect of well co-ordinated massed artillery. they simply swept away the opposition". IX Corps stormed across the Sambre Canal on 4 November (the Battle of the Sambre). After that, the campaign became a pursuit of a beaten enemy, in which the slow-moving siege guns could play no part. The war ended with the Armistice with Germany on 11 November.

93rd Siege Battery was disbanded in 1919.

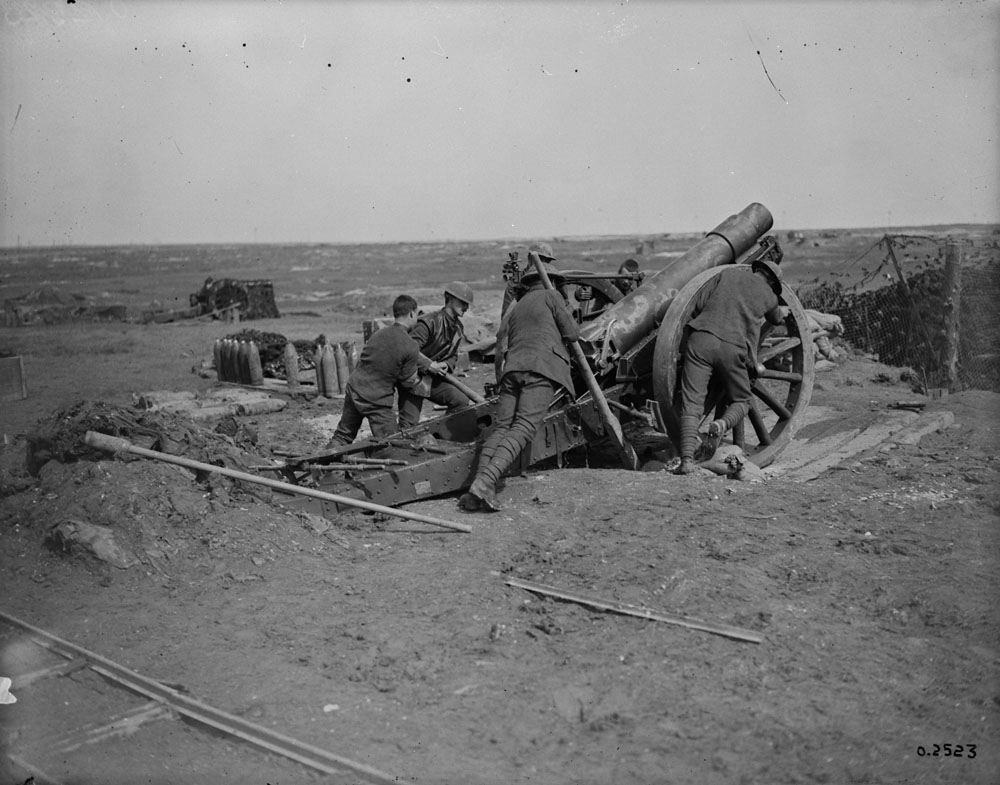
Crew positioning a 6-inch 26 cwt howitzer.

=== 173rd Siege Battery ===
173rd Siege Battery was formed at Falmouth under Army Council Instruction 1239 of 21 June 1916, based upon a cadre of 3 officers and 78 other ranks drawn from the Cornwall RGA. It went out to the Western Front on 3 October 1916, manning four 6-inch howitzers.

173rd Siege Bty was with Fifth Army during its winter operations on the Ancre, then in March 1917 it was transferred north to join First Army for the Battle of Vimy Ridge. The battery was with 63rd HAG, assigned to I Corps. At Zero hour, while the field guns laid down a Creeping barrage to protect the advancing infantry, the heavy howitzers fired 450 yards (410 m) further ahead to hit the rear areas on the reverse slope of the ridge, especially known gun positions. The attack went in on 9 April with I Corps and Canadian Corps successfully capturing Vimy Ridge

The battery switched to Fifth Army for the Third Ypres Offensive. Gun batteries were packed into the Ypres Salient where they were under observation and CB fire from the Germans on the higher ground. Casualties among guns and gunners were high, even before the offensive opened on 1 August, when Fifth Army failed to make much progress. A second push on 16 August (the Battle of Langemarck) suffered from rushed artillery planning and was unsuccessful. The offensive continued through the summer and autumn of 1917, but 173rd Siege Bty was relieved and sent to Third Army in September.

Third Army carried out a surprise attack with tanks at the Battle of Cambrai on 20 November with no preliminary bombardment. The guns opened fire at Zero hour firing 'off the map' at carefully surveyed targets. In most areas the attack was an outstanding success. Exploitation over succeeding days was less spectacular, however. On 30 November, the Germans put in a heavy counter-attack against the weakened troops in the ill-organised captured positions, and Third Army had to scramble to set up a defensible line for the winter. 173rd Siege Bty joined 54th HAG in December, and remained with after it converted into 54th Brigade and for the rest of the war.

When the German Spring Offensive began on 21 March 1918, part of Third Army was engaged in the desperate fighting, but overall it was not obliged to retreat as far or to abandon as many heavy guns as Fifth Army further south. The German offensive was halted on Third Army's front by 5 April.

Third Army joined in the victorious Hundred Days Offensive with a succession of advances, culminating in the assault crossing of the Selle on 20 October. 54th Brigade was assigned to V Corps for this, which was carried out as a surprise, with no preliminary bombardment, under a full moon. Half of the corps' heavy artillery fired a creeping barrage while the remainder carried out CB fire and bombarded specific targets. The infantry crossed their footbridges, fought their way over the railway, through the village of Neuvilly and up over three successive ridges.

After the crossing of the Selle, the campaign turned into a pursuit, and most of the siege batteries had to be left behind. 173rd Siege Battery was disbanded in 1919.

== Interwar years ==
The Cornwall RGA was placed in suspended animation after demobilisation in 1919. It reformed at Falmouth on 7 February 1920 with just two batteries, 164 from 1 and 2 Heavy Btys and Nos 3–5 and 7 Companies, and 165 from No 6 Company at Redruth. When the TF was reconstituted as the Territorial Army (TA) in 1921, the unit was renamed the Cornwall Coast Brigade, RGA, and when the RGA was subsumed into the Royal Artillery in 1924, the unit became the Cornwall Heavy Brigade, RA. It formed part of the coast defence troops in 43rd (Wessex) Divisional Area with the following organisation:

- HQ at Falmouth
- 164 Battery at Redruth, later moved to Devonport
- 165 Battery at Falmouth, later moved to Redruth

In 1926, it was decided that the coast defences of the UK would be manned by the TA alone. In October 1932, the unit's HQ was disbanded; 164 (Cornwall) Bty was amalgamated with the Devonshire Heavy Bde (which became the Devonshire and Cornwall Hvy Bde before dropping the Cornwall title in 1936), while 165 Bty was converted into 165 (Cornwall) Anti-Aircraft Bty in 56th (Cornwall) Anti-Aircraft Regiment.

== World War II ==
=== Mobilisation ===
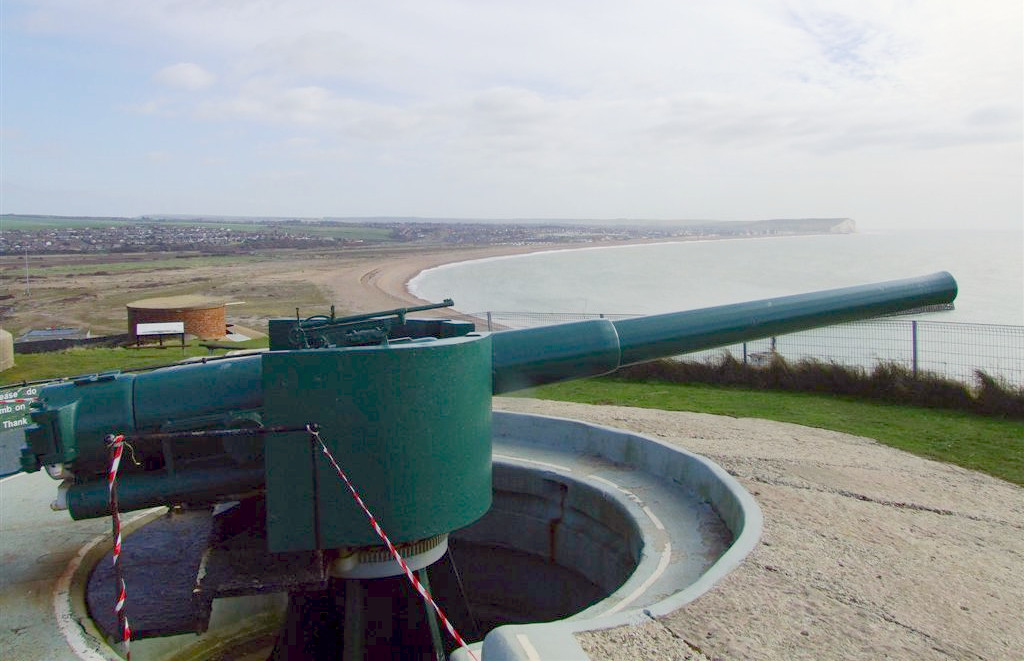
Mk VII 6-inch gun in typical coast defence emplacement, preserved at Newhaven Fort.

Following the outbreak of war, the coast artillery (CA) branch of the RA expanded rapidly. On 1 January 1940, the Devonshire Heavy Regiment (as RA brigades were termed after 1938) split into four new regiments, including the Cornwall Heavy Regiment formed from the Cornish battery. A Regular Reserve officer, Lt-Col M. Carrington-Sykes, MC, was appointed CO and simultaneously appointed Commander Fixed Defences (CFD) Falmouth, which was separated from the Plymouth Fixed Defences on that day. The new Cornwall unit, initially comprising A and B Btys, was redesignated 523rd (Cornwall) Coast Regiment in July 1940. Regimental and CFD HQ were at Pendennis Castle, and the regiment manned St Anthony Battery and the Half Moon Battery at Pendennis Castle with four 6-inch guns. There were also coast defence searchlights operated by No 5 Electric Light & Works Company, Devonshire and Cornwall Fortress Royal Engineers, until that unit left in May to be converted into field engineers.

The batteries' duties usually consisted of firing warning shots across the bows (or illuminating with searchlights) when vessels approached the harbour without showing the proper recognition signals. Otherwise, the batteries continued training, including a draft of 87 young infantrymen who were sent to be trained as gunners. When the Phoney War ended and the British Expeditionary Force was being evacuated from Dunkirk, all training was suspended and the gunners worked to complete the defences. The harbour was crowded with 157 ships carrying refugees from the Continent; the regiment found that a Boys anti-tank rifle salvaged from Dunkirk was an economical gun to fire warning shots to control these vessels. After the surrender of France on 22 June, French vessels were prevented from leaving.

After the Dunkirk evacuation, a number of emergency batteries of ex-Royal Navy guns were ordered for the Cornish ports, including two 4.7-inch guns at Fowey, where a draft arrived to form a new 364 Coast Bty under training by the Cornwall Heavy Rgt (this later joined a new 557th Coast Rgt based at St Austell). Other emergency coastal batteries at Looe, Par, Penzance, and Newquay (each of two 4-inch Mk VII guns) were manned by the newly formed 70th Medium Rgt, which established its HQ at Falmouth. 3-pounders were also mounted at Crab Quay and St Anthony Battery as anti-Motor Torpedo Boat guns. There was considerable Luftwaffe activity over Falmouth during the summer and autumn of 1940, mostly dropping Parachute mines near the harbour, bur also some bombing raids.

During October, a large number of men were drafted into the Falmouth defences from other coast and training regiments. Then, on 2 November, 394 and 395 Coast Btys were formed to relieve 70th Med Rgt at Penzance and St Ives respectively. The regiment also provided drafts to 397 Coast Bty at Padstow (one of the 4-inch emergency batteries) and to 423 Coast Bty. On 31 December, 952 Bty of 11th Defence Regiment, RA, took over the 3-pdrs. In July 1941, Royal Marines from the Marine Naval Base Defence Organisation (MNBDO) also manned anti-MTB 2-pdrs at Pendennis Point.

Part of 523 Coast Rgt's role was to carry out training for other units. The newly formed 203 Coast Bty was attached for training on 6-inch guns between 30 September and 9 December before going to Dover; in January 1941, the regiment began training gunners for Defensively equipped merchant ships (DEMS).

=== 300 Coast Battery ===
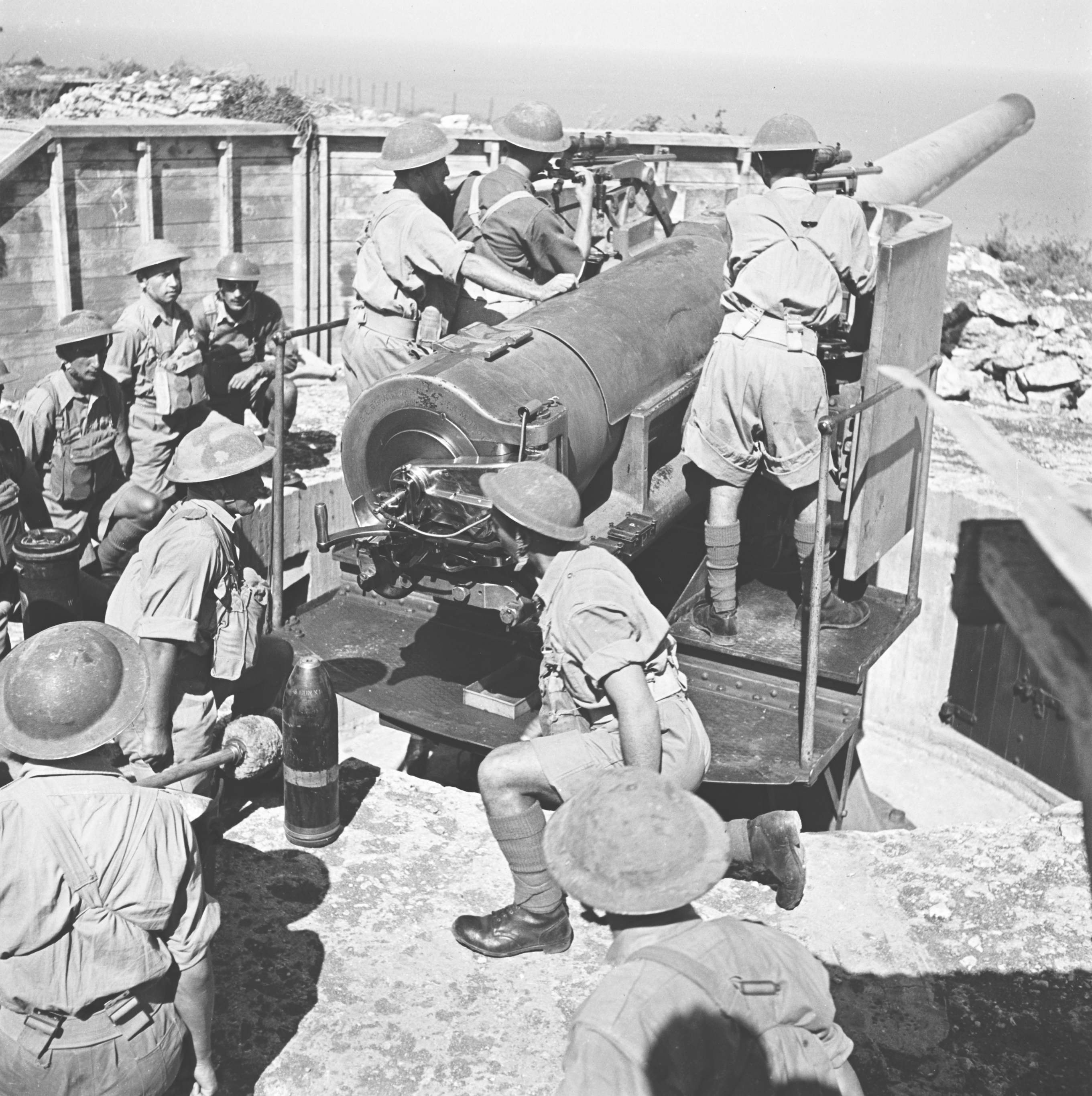
6-inch BL gun of 14th Coast Regiment, Royal Artillery, Haifa, 1941

In February 1941, 216 Bty arrived at Falmouth to take over duties from the regiment's A Bty. This new battery had been formed for the regiment on 12 December 1940 at 72nd Coast Artillery Training Rgt at Norton Camp, Yarmouth, Isle of Wight. On 7 April 1941, it took over the 6-inch guns at Half Moon Battery. A Bty under Captain E.G.J. Clapham then left 523 Rgt to join the WO Reserve. The gunners went to Aldershot to prepare for overseas service and the battery was renumbered 300 Coast Battery as an independent unit by May 1941. It sailed to the Middle East and joined 14th Coast Regiment, serving in the defences of Haifa in Palestine from September 1941 to January 1945. The battery manned three 6-inch Mk VII* guns and three 90 cm searchlights in protecting this important oil port.

At 15.09 on 10 August 1942, the battery was ordered to 'Stand To', and at 15.40 a submarine was forced to the surface by depth charges dropped by the armed trawler HMT Islay. The battery opened fire when Islay was clear, firing two rounds per gun before Islay closed in again. Dust kicked up by the guns prevented clear observation but the battery saw one hit on the target. The battery was ordered to 'Cease Fire' at 15.54 when the submarine was seen to be sinking; the stern remained in view for about 8 minutes. The submarine was the Italian boat Scirè, which had successfully launched manned torpedo attacks against British ships in harbour at Gibraltar and Alexandria, and was attempting to do the same at Haifa. The captain of Islay, Lieutenant-Commander John Ross, was awarded a DSC for the sinking.

300 Coast Bty remained in Middle East Forces until it was disbanded on 4 July 1945.

=== Mid-War ===
523 Coast Rgt's B Bty at St Anthony was redesignated 108 Coast Bty on 11 April 1941. On 16 July, 173 Bty arrived from 73rd Coast Artillery Training Rgt to join 523 Rgt and was posted to St Mawes to take over new 6-pounder twin mountings. It was followed in August 1941 by 190 Bty which arrived from 73rd Coast Training Rgt at East Blockhouse, Pembrokeshire, where it had trained as a 6-pounder battery. Unlike the other new batteries, whose cadres came from Southern Command, the cadre for 190 Coast Bty was provided by Scottish Command. It was assigned to the anti-MTB defences in Falmouth Fixed Defences, with twin 6-pdrs and also two 12-pounders, which were mounted at St Mawes and on old (1902) emplacements at Pendennis Castle until March 1942 when new emplacements were completed. In the latter part of 1941, members of the Home Guard trained on the 6-pdr anti-MTB guns.

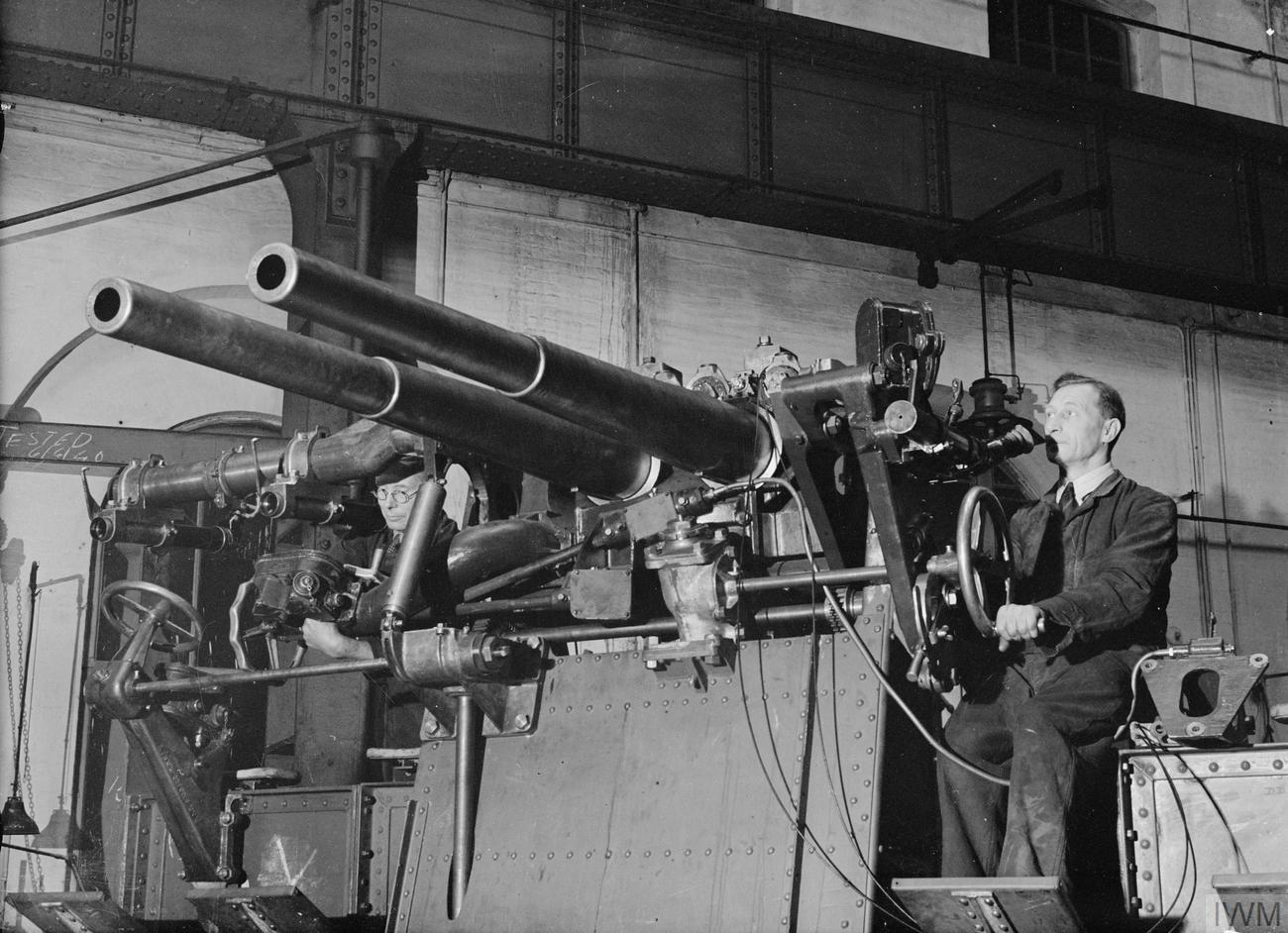
The 6-pounder gun mark I in twin coastal artillery mount.

From August to December 1941, the regiment had the following organisation:

- HQ Fixed Defences, Famouth
- HQ Falmouth Fire Command
- 108, 173, 190, 216, 394, 395 Coast Btys
- 26, 63 Coast Observer Detachments (CODs)

Lt-Col W.W. Cowan became CO of the regiment and CFD Falmouth on 19 October 1941.

=== Later War ===
On 31 January 1942, HQ Fixed Defences, Falmouth, was disbanded, and the regiment came under the control of the commander, VIII Corps Coast Artillery (later, HQ Coastal Artillery, South West District). On 11 March 1942 Lt-Col Cowan relinquished command, and Lt-Col W.A. Murley, MC, took over

On 27 March 1942, a detachment of 400 Coast Bty arrived at Toll Point from 558th Coast Rgt (based at Barnstaple, Devonshire) to assist in preparing a site for two mobile French 75mm field guns to protect the Helford River, and a month later the battery was incorporated into 523rd Rgt. During April the two 4-inch guns at St Ives were removed and replaced by two of the 138mm guns removed from the French battleships Courbet and Paris. In June, surface watching radar became operational, under No 14 Army Plotting Room (APR). On 13 June 1942, 395 Coast Bty transferred to 555th Coast Rgt (headquartered at Honiton, Devonshire) in exchange for 390 Coast Bty, which manned Hayle, St Ives. By 8 July 1942, 173 and 190 Coast Btys had swapped positions at Falmouth, taking over St Mawes and Pendennis respectively. The regiment was then disposed as follows:

- HQ – Pendennis Castle
- 108 Coast Bty – St Anthony Battery
- 173 Coast Bty – St Mawes
- 216 Coast Bty – Half Moon Battery
- 390 Coast Bty – St Ives
- 394 Coast Bty – Penzance
- 400 Coast Bty – Toll Point
- 14 APR – Falmouth

On 19 August 1942, 394 Coast Bty was transferred to 557th Coast Rgt in exchange for 392 Coast Bty at Penzance. On 12 October, 190 Coast Bty (whose cadre had come from Scottish Command) was transferred to 541st Coast Rgt at Lerwick, Shetland, and was replaced by 185 (Independent) Coast Bty, recently returned from Hvalfjörður in Iceland and previously attached to 568th (Devon) Coast Rgt at Plymouth; this took over Pendennis. By 1 November 1942, 400 Coast Bty had moved to Toll Point, and by 7 December RHQ of 532nd Coast Rgt at Falmouth was subordinated to Falmouth Fire Command.

During April 1943, the APR plotted up a number of 'unknown' and 'hostile' craft out to sea as German E-boats raided convoys, and gunfire could be heard. Usually these were out of range, but on 14 April the Royal Navy refused permission for the guns to fire, because the targets were in amongst the convoy.

Finally, on 1 May 1943, a new 442 Coast Bty was formed at Pendennis to replace 185 Bty, which went to Ramsgate, Kent, to join 549th Coast Rgt. After that, there were no further changes to the regimental organisation until after VE Day.

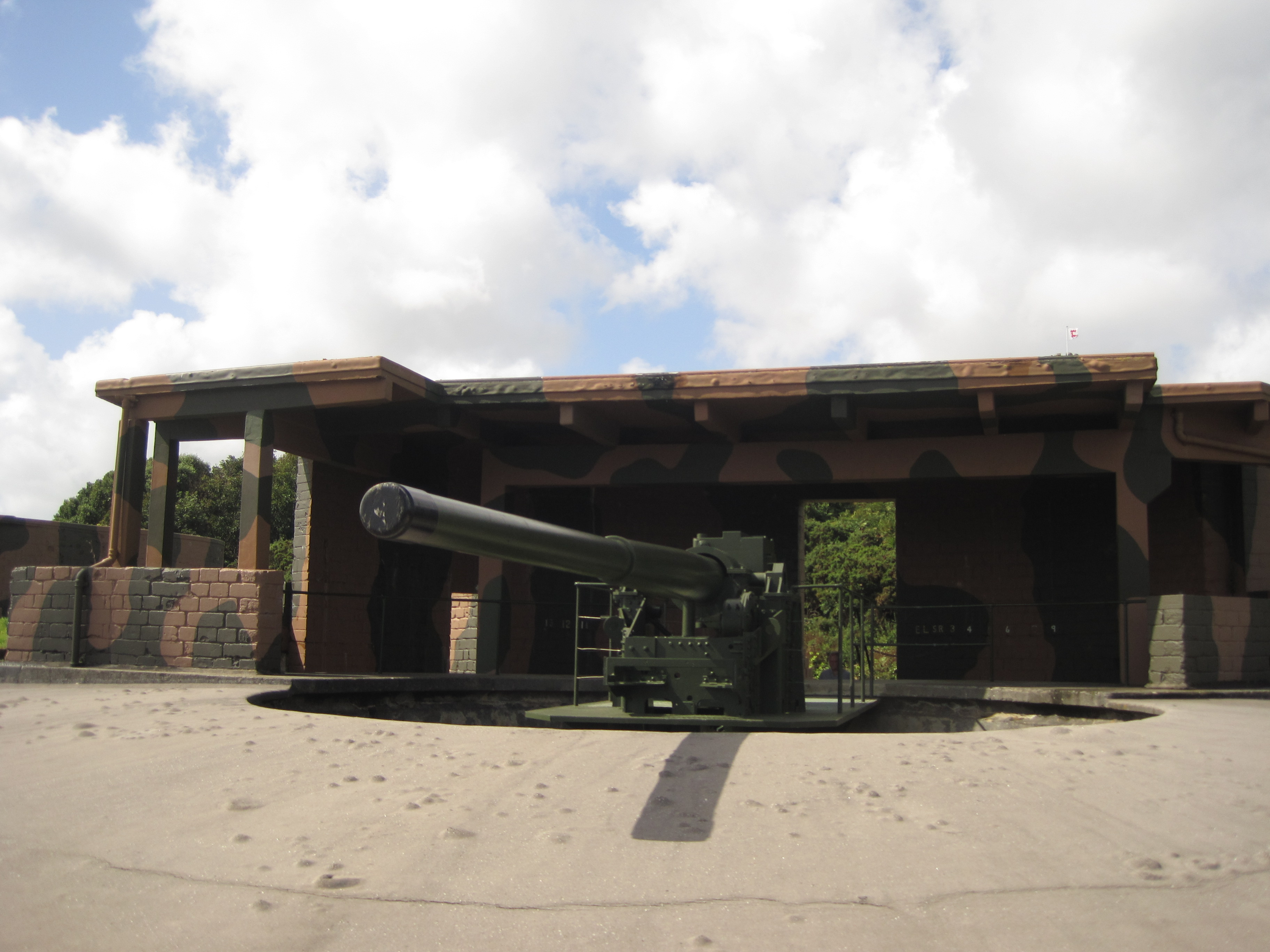
6-inch Mk XXIV gun in the Half Moon Battery at Pendennis Castle.

As the war progressed, the defences continued to be improved. In June 1943, 392 and 442 Coast Btys received projectors for naval 2-inch rockets, while 108, 216 and 400 Coast Btys each received Bofors guns (40mm light anti-aircraft guns that were also useful against light naval craft). In September, 216 Bty's two World War I-era Mk VII* 6-inch guns at the Half Moon Battery were replaced by new Mk XXIV guns. In November, 442 Bty handed over its old 12-pdrs and received Bofors.

As the invasion threat receded, the coast defences were seen as absorbing excessive manpower and were scaled back, the gunners being redeployed. During November 1943, the regiment lost a large number of men to other RA branches, to the infantry, to the navy and to coal mining, reducing its strength from around 600 to around 425 by the end of the year, and 108 Bty became non-operational. By March 1944, the old 75mm mobile guns were withdrawn, but on two occasions that month 216 Bty engaged hostile surface vessels using radar for range finding. Despite this E-boat activity the coastal artillery branch continued to shrink, a number of officers and other ranks being transferred in from disbanded units; on 1 April, three further batteries (212, 379 and 393) were regimented with 523rd Coast Rgt. Later that month, 18, 79 and 83 CODs were disbanded and a few of their men posted to the regiment, though the overall strength of the regiment remained roughly constant.

In September, the Home Guard was stood down, and its men ceased to do duty with the regiment, while a number of guns and searchlights became non-operational. St Anthony Battery had become an RA Training Centre where 200 men were being trained in light anti-aircraft and field gunnery. In November, 390 and 392 Btys became non-operational; then, in January 1945, most of the gun positions were reduced to 'care and maintenance' and 130 other ranks were posted to 618th (Dorsetshire) Infantry Regiment, RA, formed for garrison duties. In February, another 98 ORs went to 566th Coast Rgt, and the 138mm guns were removed from St Ives to Pendennis for storage. By VE Day, the strength of the regiment had dwindled to about 130 all ranks.

On 1 June 1945, 108 Coast Bty (the original B Bty) began passing into suspended animation, completing the process on 22 June. Between 3 March and 27 April 1946, RHQ and 173, 216, 390 392, 400 and 442 Coast Btys also passed into suspended animation.

== Postwar ==
When the TA was reconstituted on 1 January 1947, the regiment was reformed as 409 Coast Regiment RA (Cornwall) (TA) with headquarters at Falmouth. It was part of 102 Coast Brigade, based at Plymouth, within Southern Command.

With the disbandment of Coast Artillery in the UK in 1956, the unit was converted to Royal Engineers as 409th (Cornwall) Independent Field Squadron, RE, incorporating a Troop of 571 Construction Squadron from 115 Construction Rgt, RE. In 1961, it dropped its 'Independent' subtitle and was assigned to a new 116 (Devon and Cornwall) Engineer Regiment, RE. The regiment was disbanded on 1 April 1967 when the TA was reduced and converted into the Territorial and Army Volunteer Reserve.

== Uniform ==
The original dress of the 3rd Cornwall AVC at Fowey was a long knitted blue fisherman's jersey with the collar, cuffs and bottom edge braided in red. Embroidered on the front in red wool was a device 'C.V.A.' over the figure 3, above an inverted triangle of 15 roundels (from the top 5–4–3–2–1) over a scroll embroidered 'ONE AND ALL'. The inverted triangle (or 'pile') of roundels (or 'bezants') derived from the coat of arms of the Duchy of Cornwall. It was designed by the Lord Lieutenant of Cornwall and was worn by all ranks of the 3rd AVC 1860–61.

By 1872, the uniform of all the Corps consisted of a blue tunic of Royal Artillery pattern with black cord trimmings, blue cloth trousers with red stripes, a black leather waistbelt on which was fixed the pouch, worn on the right hip. On the shoulder straps of the tunic the number of the battery was embroidered in red figures. White cotton gloves were also worn. There was no full dress uniform, and this pattern was worn by both officers and other ranks.

== Honorary Colonels ==
The following served as Honorary Colonel of the unit:

- Thomas W. Field, VD, commissioned as major in the unit 1874, lt-col 1896, appointed 20 September 1902
- Brigadier-General Lord St Levan, CVO, CB, retired colonel, Grenadier Guards, appointed 5 July 1913; became joint Hon Col of the Devonshire & Cornwall Hvy Bde in 1932

== External sources ==
- The Drill Hall Project
- Great War Forum
- The Long, Long Trail
- Patriot Files orders of battle
- The Regimental Warpath 1914–1918 (archive site)
- Land Forces of Britain, the Empire and Commonwealth (regiments.org – archive site)
- British Military History
- Roll of Honour
- Royal Artillery 1939–1945
- Graham Watson, The Territorial Army 1947
- British Army units from 1945 on
