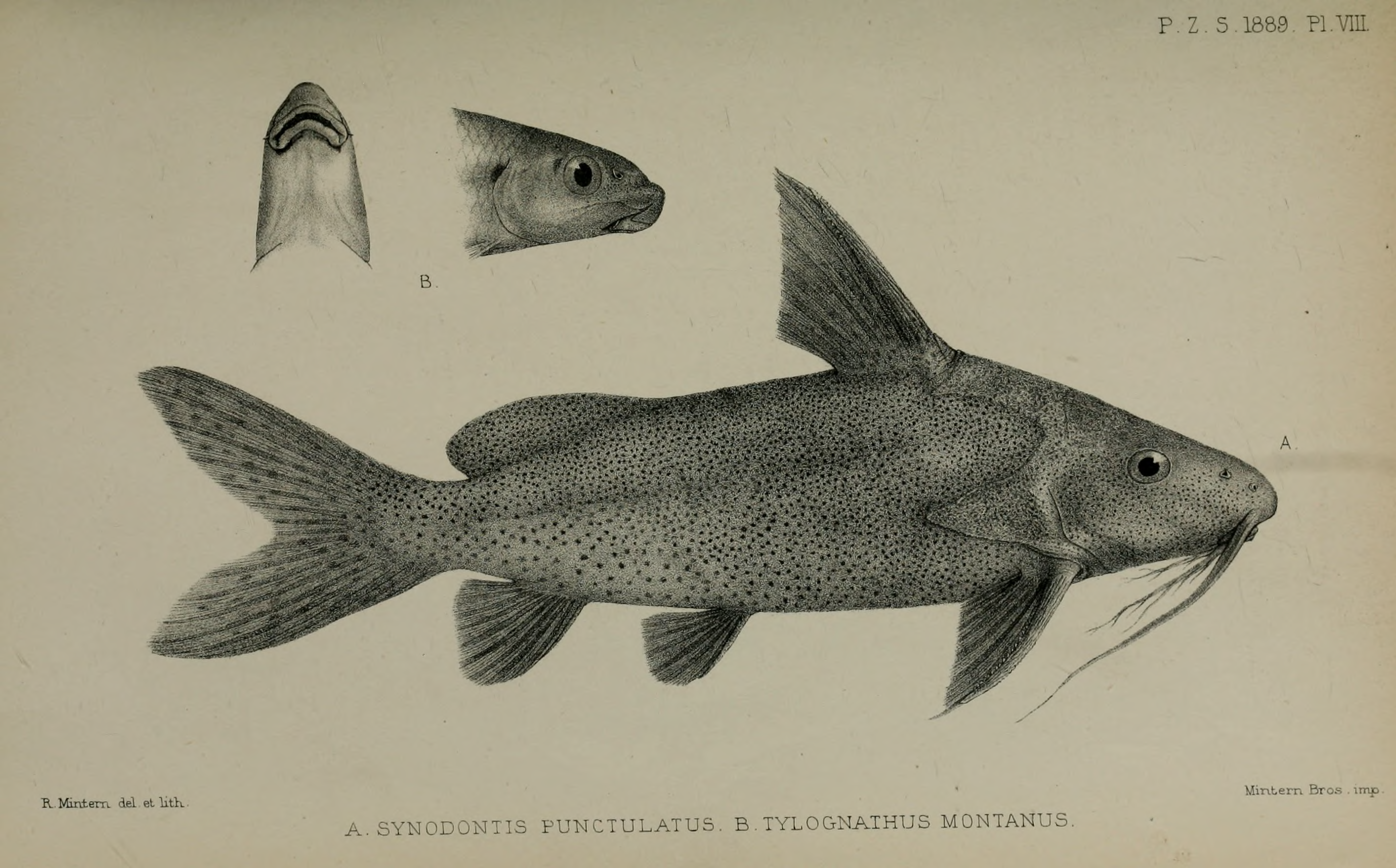

Conservation status
- Data Deficient (IUCN 3.1)

Scientific classification
- Kingdom: Animalia
- Phylum: Chordata
- Class: Actinopterygii
- Order: Siluriformes
- Family: Mochokidae
- Genus: Synodontis
- Species: S. punctulatus

Binomial name
- Synodontis punctulatus Günther, 1889

= Synodontis punctulatus =

Species of fish

Synodontis punctulatus is a species of upside-down catfish native to Ethiopia, Somalia and Tanzania where it is found in the Pangani and Shebelle Rivers. This species grows to a length of 25 centimetres (9.8 in) TL.

== Sources ==
- Getahun, A.; Hanssens, M. & Snoeks, J. (2010). "Synodontis punctulatus". IUCN Red List of Threatened Species. 2010 e.T60332A12352158. doi:10.2305/IUCN.UK.2010-3.RLTS.T60332A12352158.en.
- Froese, Rainer; Pauly, Daniel (eds.). "Synodontis punctulatus". FishBase. May 2014 version.
