= Songoro, Meru =

Ward in Meru District, Arusha Region

Songoro Ward Kata ya Songoro (Swahili)
- Ward
- Kata ya Songoro
- Location within Tanzania
- Country: Tanzania
- Region: Arusha Region
- District: Meru District

Area
  - Total: 114.0 km^{2} (44.0 sq mi)
- Elevation: 1,285 m (4,216 ft)

Population (2012)
  - Total: 11,139
  - Density: 97.71/km^{2} (253.1/sq mi)

Songoro is an administrative ward in the Meru District of the Arusha Region of Tanzania. The ward covers an area of 114.0 km^{2} (44.0 sq mi), and has an average elevation of 1,285 m (4,216 ft). The ward is the source of the Kikuletwa River through the Tengeru River as a tributary which eventually leads to the Pangani River. According to the 2012 census, the ward has a total population of 11,139.
