= St Anthony Head =

Headland on the Roseland Peninsula, Cornwall, England

Coordinates: 50.141369°N 5.014958°W

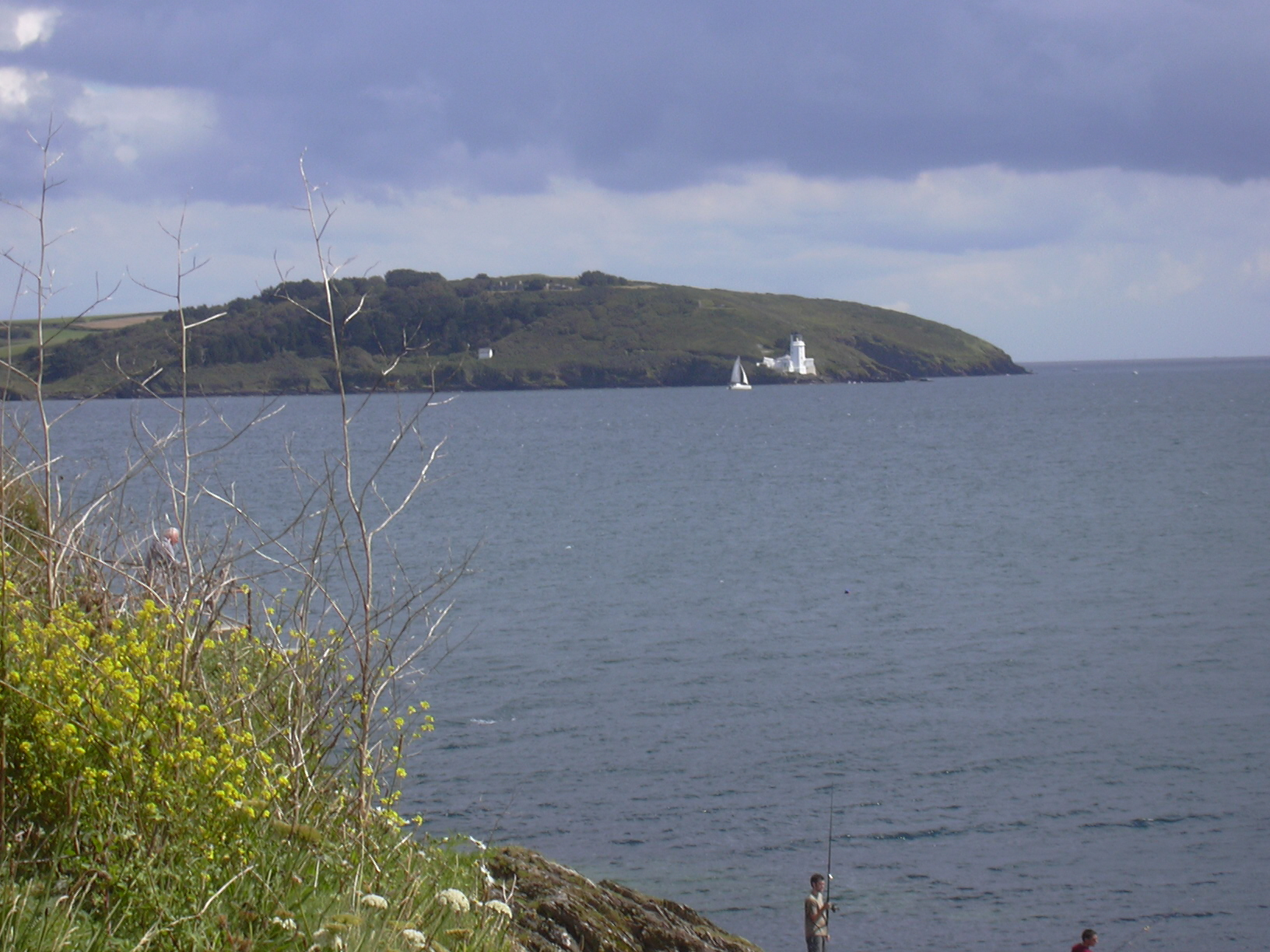
St Anthony Head and Lighthouse, as seen from Pendennis Head.

St Anthony Head (Cornish: Penn Entenin) is a National Trust property situated at the southernmost tip of the Roseland Peninsula, Cornwall, England, United Kingdom, overlooking the entrance to one of the world's largest natural harbours: Carrick Roads and the estuary of River Fal. It preserves the former St Anthony Battery, built in 1895–97 to defend the estuary of the River Fal.

The headland is designated as part of Carricknath Point to Porthbean Beach and Lower Fal & Helford Intertidal Sites of Special Scientific Interest. At its tip lies St Anthony's Lighthouse.

== Shipwreck ==
Empire Tavistock was a 798 GRT coastal tanker which was built by Grangemouth Dockyard Co Ltd, Grangemouth. Launched on 29 January 1945 and completed in April 1945. Sold in 1946 to Van Castricum & Co Ltd, London and renamed Sobat. Sold in 1951 to F. T. Everard & Sons Ltd and renamed Allegrity. On 13 December 1961 she ran aground at Greeb Point, St Anthony Head, Cornwall. Refloated by the tide, drifted and grounded at Veryan Beach. Capsized on 22 December and declared a total loss.
