= Kikuletwa River =

River in Kilimanjaro Region, Tanzania

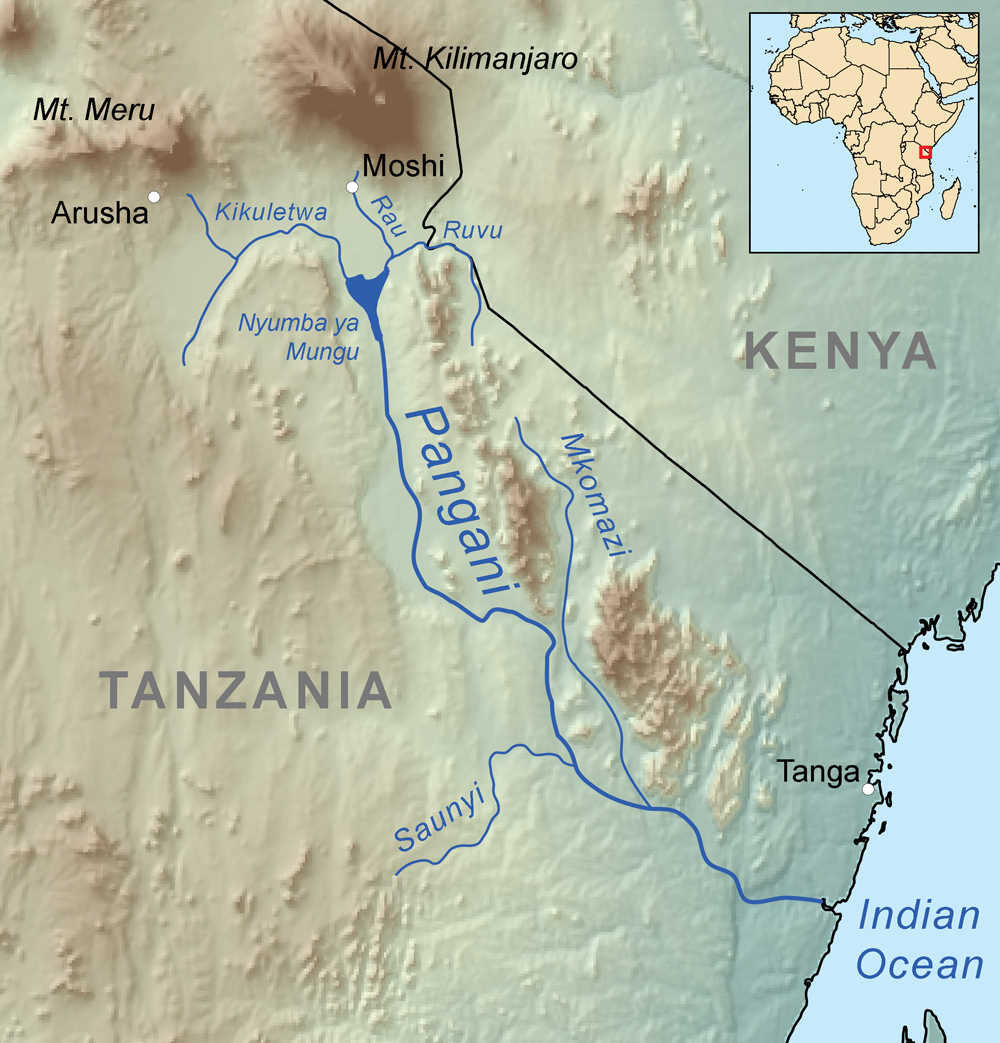
- Native name: Mto Kikuletwa (Swahili)

Location
- Country: Tanzania
- Region: Arusha Region, Manyara Region & Kilimanjaro Region
- District: Meru District
- Ward: Songoro

Physical characteristics
- Source
  - location: Songoro, Meru District, Arusha
  - coordinates: 3°19′32.16″S 36°49′41.88″E

Basin features
- River system: Pangani River
- Tributaries
  - left: Burka River
  - right: Tengeru River

Kikuletwa River (Swahili: Mto Kikuletwa) is located in the northern Kilimanjaro Region, Manyara Region and eastern Arusha Region of Tanzania. It begins in Songoro ward in Meru District, Arusha and eventually drains into Pangani River at Nyumba ya Mungu Dam. The Kikuletwa hot springs also drain into the river.
