= Msangazi River =

River in Tanzania

Coordinates: 6.089°S 37.608°E

Msangazi River is a river of Tanzania. It is part of the Pangani River basin.
