= Carricknath Point to Porthbean Beach =

Protected area in Cornwall, England

- Site of Special Scientific Interest
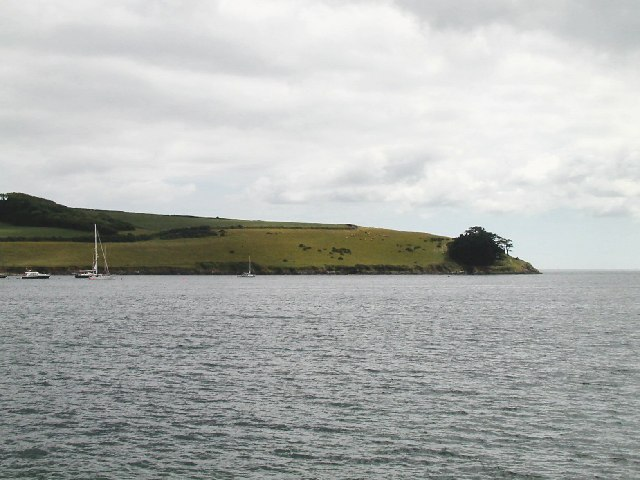
- Carricknath Point, in the west of the SSSI

- Location within Cornwall Location within England
- Location of Carricknath Point to Porthbean Beach.
- Area of search: Cornwall
- Grid reference: SW870330
- Coordinates: 50.1637°N 4.9747°W
- Interest: Biological
- Area: 49.49 hectares (0.495 km^{2}; 0.191 sq mi)
- Notification date: 2000

Carricknath Point to Porthbean Beach (Cornish: Karrik Nadh, meaning hewn rock and Cornish: Porth Bian, meaning small cove) is a coastal Site of Special Scientific Interest (SSSI) in Cornwall, England, UK, noted for its biological interest.

== Geography ==
There are 3 separate sites to this SSSI, which cover a 49.5-hectare (122-acre) area on the south Cornish coast, within the civil parish of Gerrans, 2 miles (3.2 km) east of the town of St Mawes. The first is from Carricknath Point to St Anthony Head, at the southern tip of the civil parish, the second is from Porthbeor Beach to Portscatho and the third is at Porthbean Beach, to the northern end of the parish.

The South West Coast Path runs through the SSSI and part of the coastline around St Anthony Head is owned by the National Trust. The shoreline below this section is part of the Lower Fal & Helford Intertidal SSSI, the cliffs being designated as within this SSSI.

== Wildlife and ecology ==
The habitat of the first, southernmost, section consists of cliffs overhanging damp rock ledges in which the internationally rare and threatened Shore Dock (Rumex rupestris) can be found, amongst other flora.

The second stretch of coastline contains a variety of different coastal habitats, including sand covered beaches, natural rock platforms with fragments of saltmarsh, cliff top grassland and low rocky headlands. Here the nationally scarce species of Babington's Leek (Allium ampeloprasum) and Hairy Bird's-foot Trefoil (Lotus subbiflorus) grows, and a variety of invertebrates can be found.

The third, northernmost section, at Porthbean Beach the nationally declining species of Sea Kale (Crambe maritima) occurs.
