= St Anthony's Lighthouse =

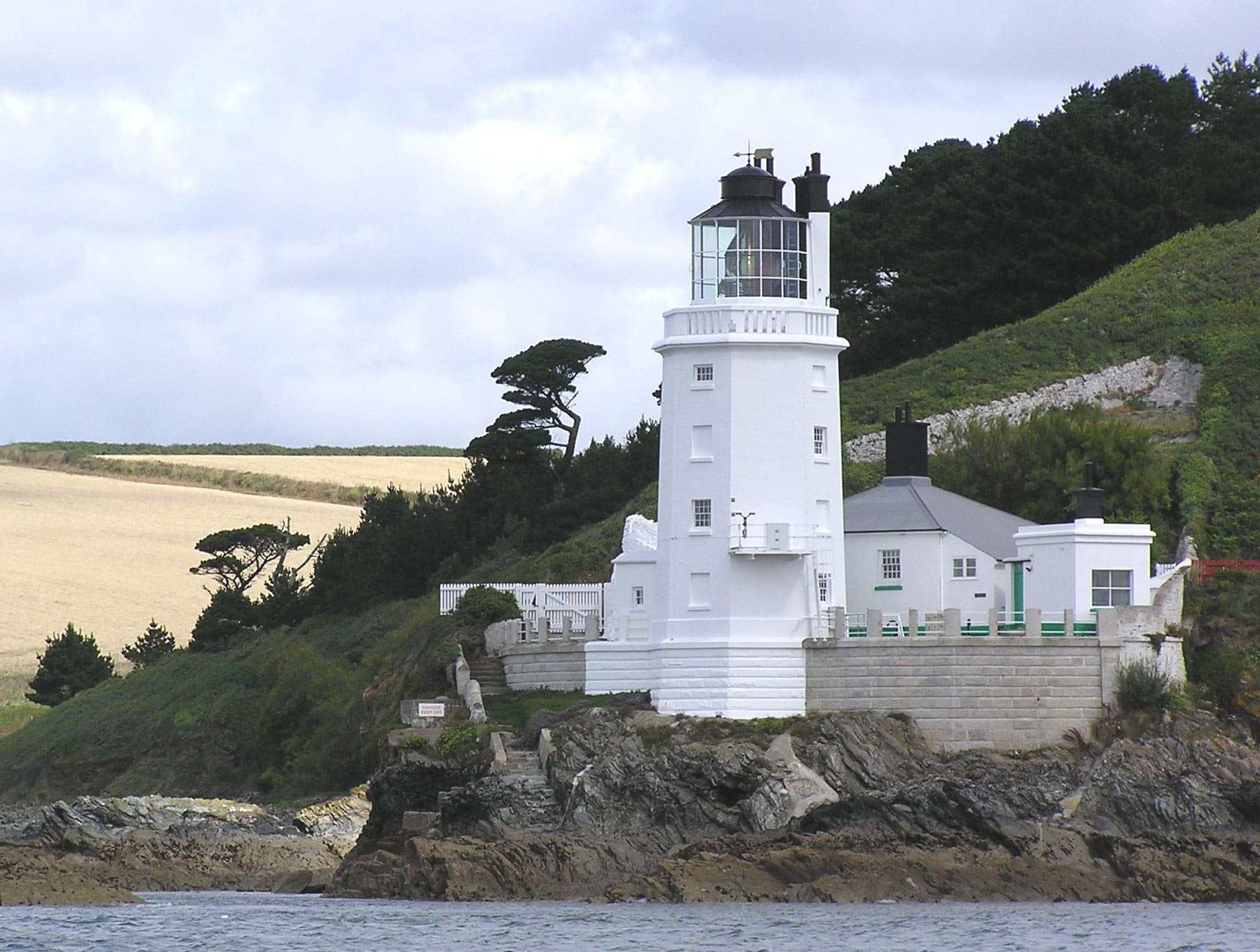
- Location: St Anthony Head; Cornwall; England
- OS grid: SW8460431149
- Coordinates: 50.14115°N 5.016067°W

Tower
- Constructed: 1835
- Construction: granite tower
- Automated: 1987
- Height: 19 metres (62 ft)
- Shape: octagonal tower with balcony and lantern attached to a 2-storey keeper's house
- Markings: white tower and lantern
- Operator: Trinity House
- Heritage: Grade II listed building

Light
- Focal height: 22 metres (72 ft)
- Lens: 1st order fixed lens
- Light source: LED
- Intensity: white: red:
- Range: white:12 nautical miles (22 km; 14 mi) red: 9 nautical miles (17 km; 10 mi)
- Characteristic: Iso WR 15s.

Listed Building – Grade II
- Official name: Saint Anthony's Lighthouse and Keepers Cottage
- Designated: 25 June 1985
- Reference no.: 1136282

St Anthony's Lighthouse is the lighthouse at St Anthony Head, on the eastern side of the entrance to Falmouth harbour, Cornwall, UK. The harbour is also known as Carrick Roads and is one of the largest natural harbours in the world.

== History ==
The lighthouse was designed by James Walker and built in 1835 by Olver of Falmouth, for Trinity House and the original light came from eight Argand oil lamps mounted on a revolving frame. The light was seen to flash once every twenty seconds. In 1865 an additional lamp and reflector were installed 'in the living room of the principal keeper' which shone a fixed light through a square window in the direction of a dangerous cluster of rocks known as The Manacles. (At the time the principal keeper and his family lived in the tower itself, while the assistant lived in the cottage, linked to the lighthouse by a covered way). After 1903 this subsidiary light was instead shown from a separate 'hut' 20 ft (6.1 m) from the tower itself.

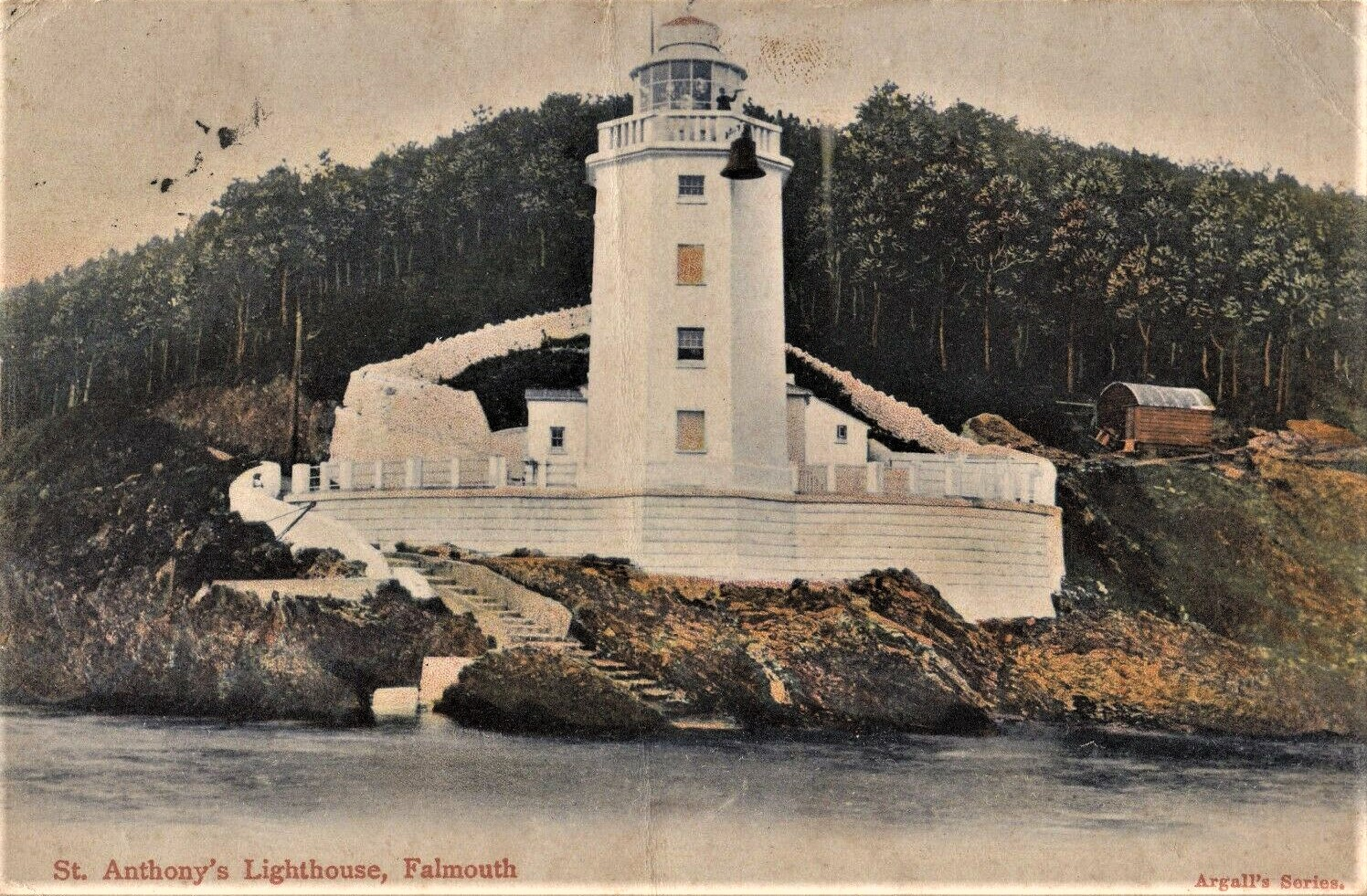
St Anthony's Lighthouse in 1904, with reflector lamps and fog bell.

A fog-bell was installed in 1865, replaced in 1882 by a larger, two-ton bell, 5-foot (1.5 m) in diameter (reputedly the heaviest bell in Cornwall). It hung from a girder attached to the front of the gallery. A set of weights, descending a 38-foot (12 m) shaft, drove the rotating optic; during foggy weather additional, heavier weights were engaged and the same mechanism then also activated the bell, which sounded four times every minute.

After the closure of the lighthouse at St Agnes, Isles of Scilly in 1911, St Anthony's was (along with Cromer) one of the only major Trinity House lights still using reflectors rather than Fresnel lenses. At that time it still used the same arrangement of eight lamps, providing a flash every twenty seconds. In 1912–13, however, work was underway for the 'improvement of [the] high and abolition of [the] low light': and by 1920, the light source had been changed to pressure vapour and a large (first-order) fixed Fresnel optic had been introduced (along with a clockwork occulting mechanism, which eclipsed the light for three seconds in every twenty). The size of the lens meant that the height of the lantern had to be increased. As part of these improvements the subsidiary light was discontinued, being replaced by the addition of a red sector to the main lamp.

Electric light was introduced (in the form of a 24kW filament lamp) when electricity was connected to the lighthouse in 1954. At the same time an experimental electric fog signal was introduced, sounding from 35 Tannoy emitters (subsequently Trinity House installed fog signals of this type at a dozen or so other lighthouses). The fog bell, which hung from the gallery at the front of the tower, was therefore decommissioned; it was donated to the nearby Penwerris church, but after many years of sitting on the church front lawn, was taken away to be melted down.

== Present day ==
Today the light is automated, flashing every 15 seconds, with a red sector for The Manacles. The fog horn blasts once every 30 seconds. In 2022 the range of the light was reduced from 22 nautical miles to 12 (and the red sector light from 20 nmi to 9); the optic remains in use but the light source is now LED.

== The lighthouse in popular culture ==
St. Anthony's lighthouse was featured in the intro of the UK version of Jim Henson's Fraggle Rock, as "Fraggle Rock Lighthouse". Nearby St. Mawes is also featured in some scenes from the programme. It also featured in one of episode of Ragdoll Productions' preschool series; Tots TV.

== See also ==
- List of lighthouses in England
