= Ruvu Jipe River =

River in Kilimanjaro Region, Tanzania

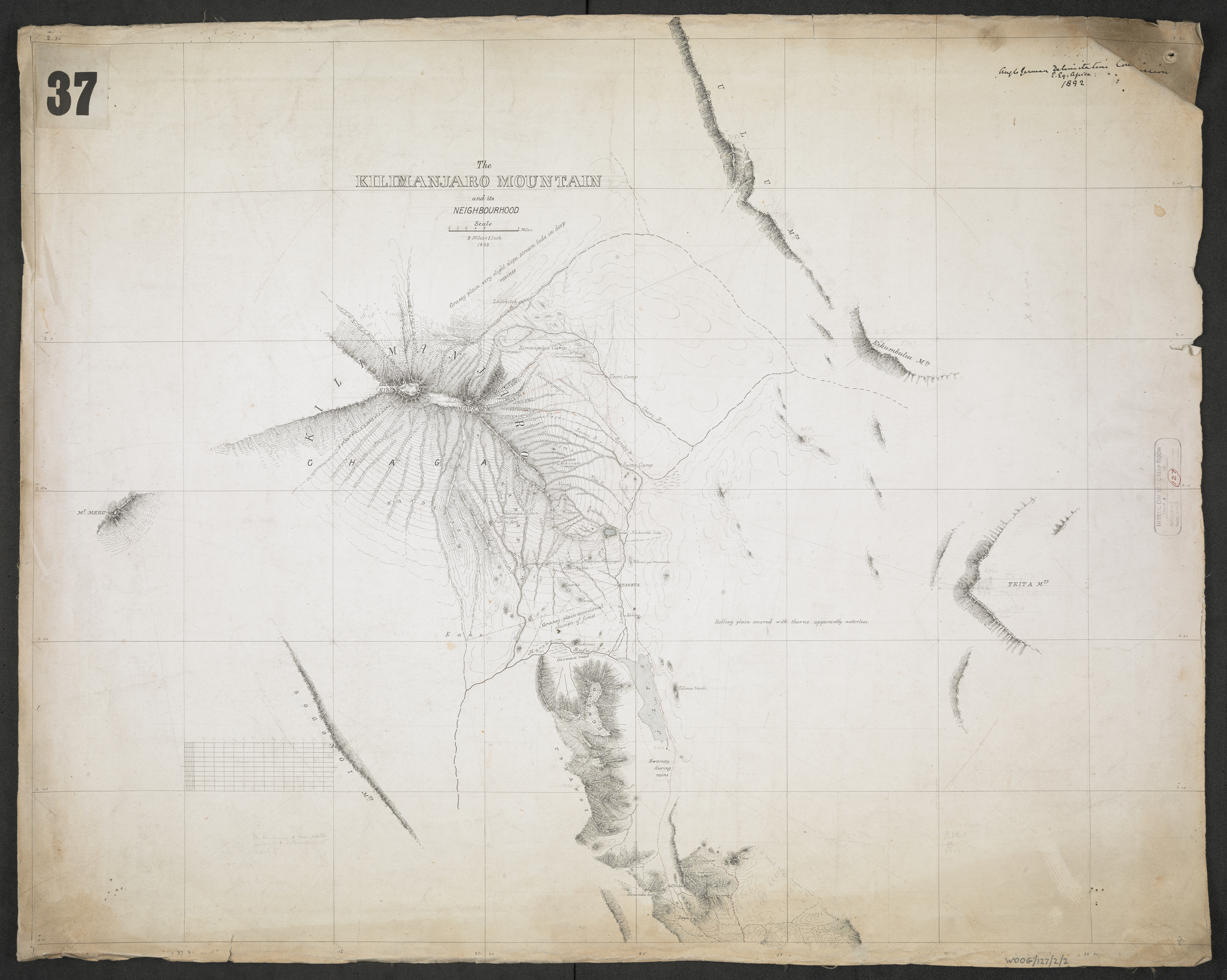
- 1892 map showing Ruvu Jipe River with the name Rufu River
- Native name: Mto Ruvu Jipe (Swahili)

Location
- Country: Tanzania
- Region: Kilimanjaro Region
- District: Mwanga District
- Ward: Kileo

Physical characteristics
- Source
  - location: Lake Jipe, Mwanga District
  - coordinates: 3°43′59.88″S 37°39′0″E

Basin features
- River system: Pangani River

Ruvu Jipe River, also known as Luffu and Jipe Ruvu and Ruvu Pangani (Mto Ruvu Jipe in Swahili), is located in northern Kilimanjaro Region's Mwanga District of Tanzania. It begins in Kileo ward at Lake Jipe and eventually drains into Nyumba ya Mungu Dam and into Pangani River at Lang'ata ward.
