= Saunyi River =

River in Tanga Region, Tanzania

- Native name: Mto Saunyi (Swahili)

Location
- Country: Tanzania
- Region: Manyara Region & Tanga Region
- District: Kilindi District, Handeni District, Kiteto District & Korogwe District
- Ward: Mkindi, Saunyi, Misima, Ruvu Remiti & Mkalamo

Physical characteristics
- Source
  - location: Mkindi, Kilindi District
  - coordinates: 5°18′25.2″S 37°53′34.8″E

Basin features
- River system: Pangani River

Saunyi River (Mto Saunyi in Swahili) is located in the western Tanga Region and southern Manyara Region of Tanzania. It begins in Mkindi ward in Kilindi District of Tanga Region and eventually drains into Pangani River at Mkalamo ward in Korogwe District.
