= Masama Rundugai =

Ward in Hai District, Kilimanjaro Region

Masama Rundugai Ward Kata ya Masama Rundugai (Swahili)
- Ward
- Kata ya Masama Rundugai, Wilaya ya Hai
- Location within Tanzania
- Country: Tanzania
- Region: Kilimanjaro Region
- District: Hai District

Area
  - Total: 106.8 km^{2} (41.2 sq mi)
- Elevation: 851 m (2,792 ft)

Population (2012)
  - Total: 14,033
  - Density: 131.4/km^{2} (340.3/sq mi)

Masama Rundugai is an administrative ward in Hai District of Kilimanjaro Region in Tanzania. The ward covers an area of 82.6 km^{2} (31.9 sq mi), and has an average elevation of 851 m (2,792 ft). According to the 2012 census, the ward has a total population of 14,033.
