= St Anthony Battery =

Coordinates: 50°14′18″N 5°01′38″W

- St Anthony Head; Cornwall; England
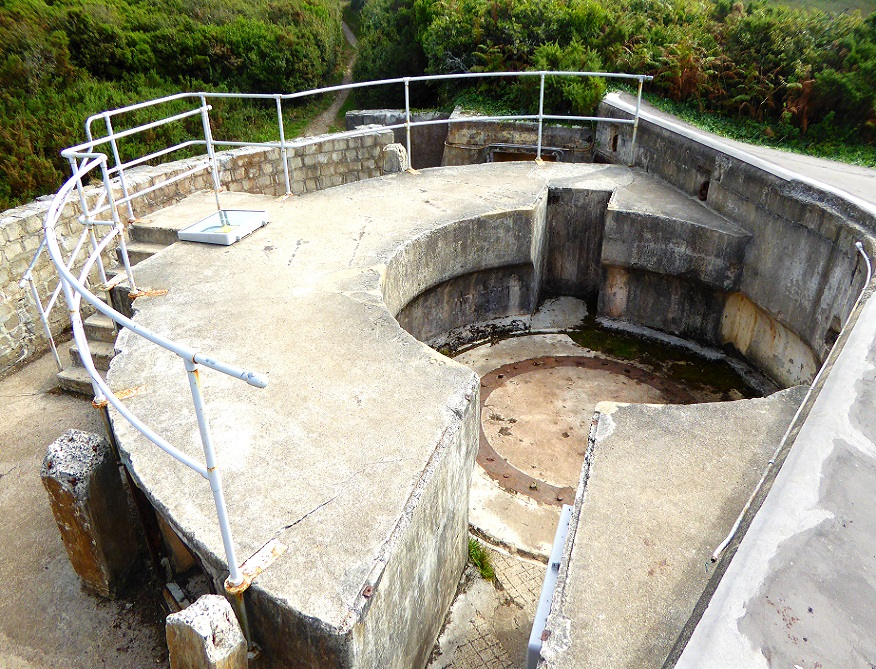
- The excavated and restored eastern gun emplacement of St Anthony Battery.

Site information
- Owner: National Trust
- Open to the public: Yes

Location

Site history
- Built: 1895-97
- In use: 1897-1956

St Anthony Battery is a former 19th century gun battery at St Anthony Head, Roseland Peninsula, Cornwall, England. It was built in 1895–1897 and served during both World Wars. Following its decommissioning in 1956, the battery was acquired by the National Trust.

== History ==
The battery was built in 1895–1897 to defend the estuary of the River Fal and originally installed with two BL 6-inch Mk VI naval guns. They were replaced in 1903–04 with BL 6-inch Mk VII naval guns, which remained in place until 1924. After a period under care and maintenance, the battery was rearmed during World War II with two 6-inch VII guns, with an additional two Ordnance QF 3-pounder Vickers placed nearby. The battery also served as an examination battery alongside Half Moon Battery at Pendennis Castle.

Following the dissolution of coast artillery in the United Kingdom in 1956, the battery's two gun emplacements were infilled with rubble and earth, while the site was acquired by the National Trust in 1959. In 2012, the eastern gun emplacement was excavated and restored as part of the "Unlocking our Coastal Heritage" project, which aimed to "increase the economic value of the South West Coast Path by protecting and enhancing heritage features". The battery is accessible to the public, while tours are carried out during the peak season by the National Trust.
