= Pangani River =

River in northeastern Tanzania

Coordinates: 5°26′S 38°58′E

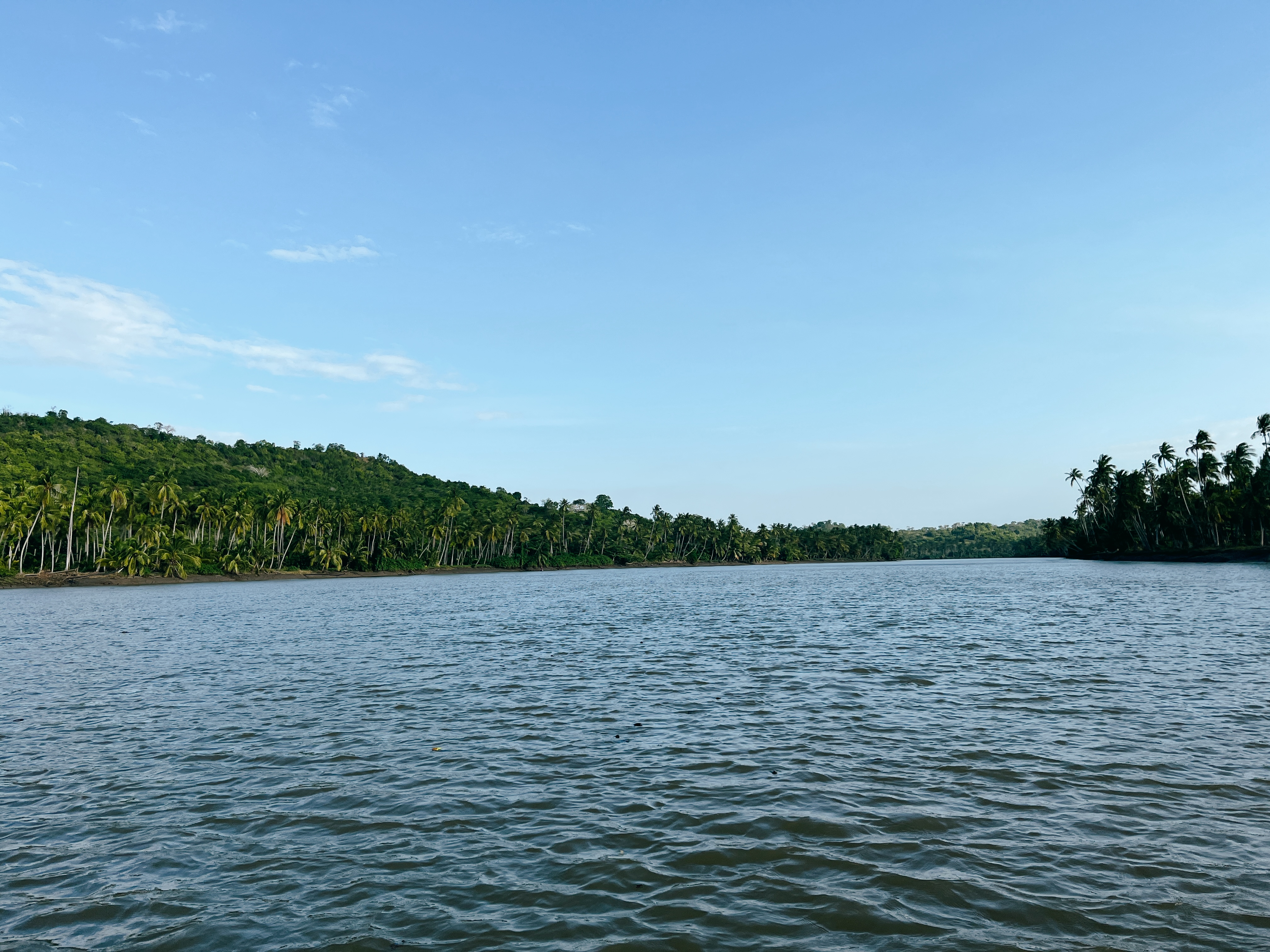
- Pangani River in Bushiri ward.

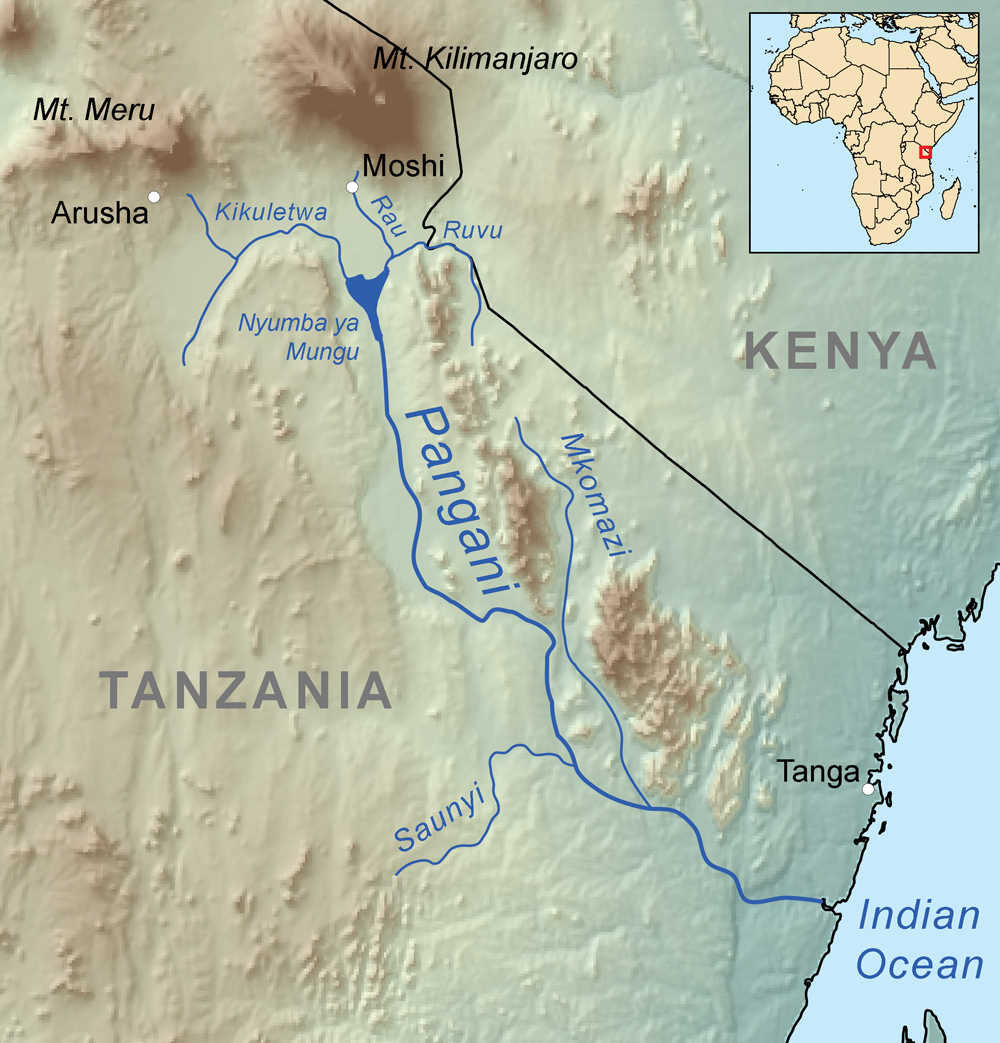
- Map of River Pangani
- Native name: Mto Pangani (Swahili)

Location
- Country: Tanzania
- Region: Tanga Region, Arusha Region, Manyara Region, Kilimanjaro Region
- District: Arusha District Council, Meru District, Arusha City Council, Hai District, Moshi District, Mwanga District, Same District, Korogwe District, Korogwe Town, Muheza District, Pangani District,

Physical characteristics
- Source
  - location: Arusha District, Arusha Region
- Mouth
  - location: Indian Ocean at the town of Pangani, Pangani District, Tanga Region
- Length: 500km
- Basin size: 43,650 km^{2} (16,850 sq mi)
- Discharge
  - average: 27 m^{3}/s (950 cu ft/s)

Basin features
- Tributaries
  - left: Mkomazi; Luengera
  - right: Lumoromo; Fukda; Mkalami

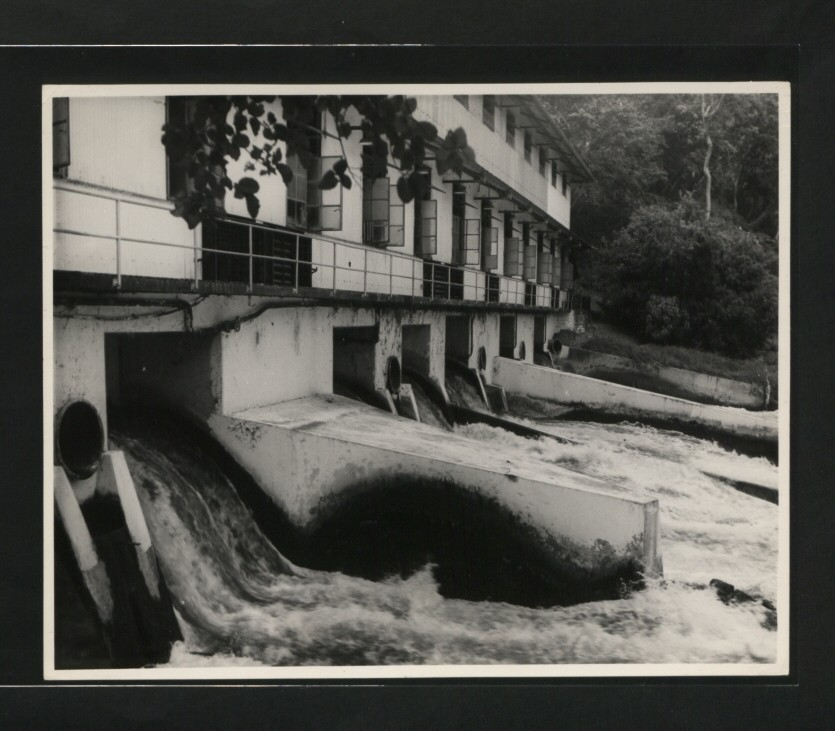
Pangani Hydro Electric Scheme

The Pangani River (Mto Pangani, in Swahili), (also called Luffu and Jipe Ruvu, especially in older sources, and probably once called Rhaptus) is a major river of northeastern Tanzania. It has two main sources: the Ruvu, which rises as Lumi at Kilimanjaro, passes through Lake Jipe, and empties into the Nyumba ya Mungu Reservoir, and the Kikuletwa River, coming from the west and mainly fed by rivers of Mount Meru in Arusha Region, which also enters into the Nyumba ya Mungu Reservoir in Kilimanjaro Region. Just after leaving the reservoir the stream becomes the main Pangani, which empties into the Indian Ocean in Tanga Region at the Tangan port town of Pangani.

For much of its length the river flows along the regional borders of Kilimanjaro Region and Manyara Region, before flowing into Tanga Region, which contains the 68 MW Pangani Power Station and the Pangani Falls Dam. There are several inhabited islands within the river. The river is full of crocodiles; hippopotami are scarcer in its lower parts.

== Etymology ==
A main source of Pangani originates on Kilimanjaro, where it is the River Lumi. Lake Jipe may be considered a backwater of the Lumi. Below Lake Jipe and above the falls, the river is referred to as "Ruvu".

Formerly the main course towards the sea was alternatively called "Ruvu" and "Pangani". Nowadays that has been settled as "Pangani" from the Nyumba ya Mungu reservoir to the Ocean. While the Swahili call it "Pangani" (meaning distribute or arrange), it is called "Luffu" by the Wasambara (indigenous to the Nderema area, on the three ridges nearer the coast) and the Zigua (who live on the river's islands). Almost all authorities agree that the river "Rhaptus" of Ptolemy's topographical maps is the Pangani of modern maps.

== Geography ==
The Pangani is 500 kilometres (310 mi) in length.

One source of the river rises in Kilimanjaro, about 120 miles (190 km) from the sea. Known as the Lumi in this area, its course runs through Lake Jipe. The other is at Mount Meru in the west and is known as the Kikuletwa. Like all African rivers, its depth varies with the season. The river is highest around May and lowest around October. Another source is the Saunyi River in Kilindi District.

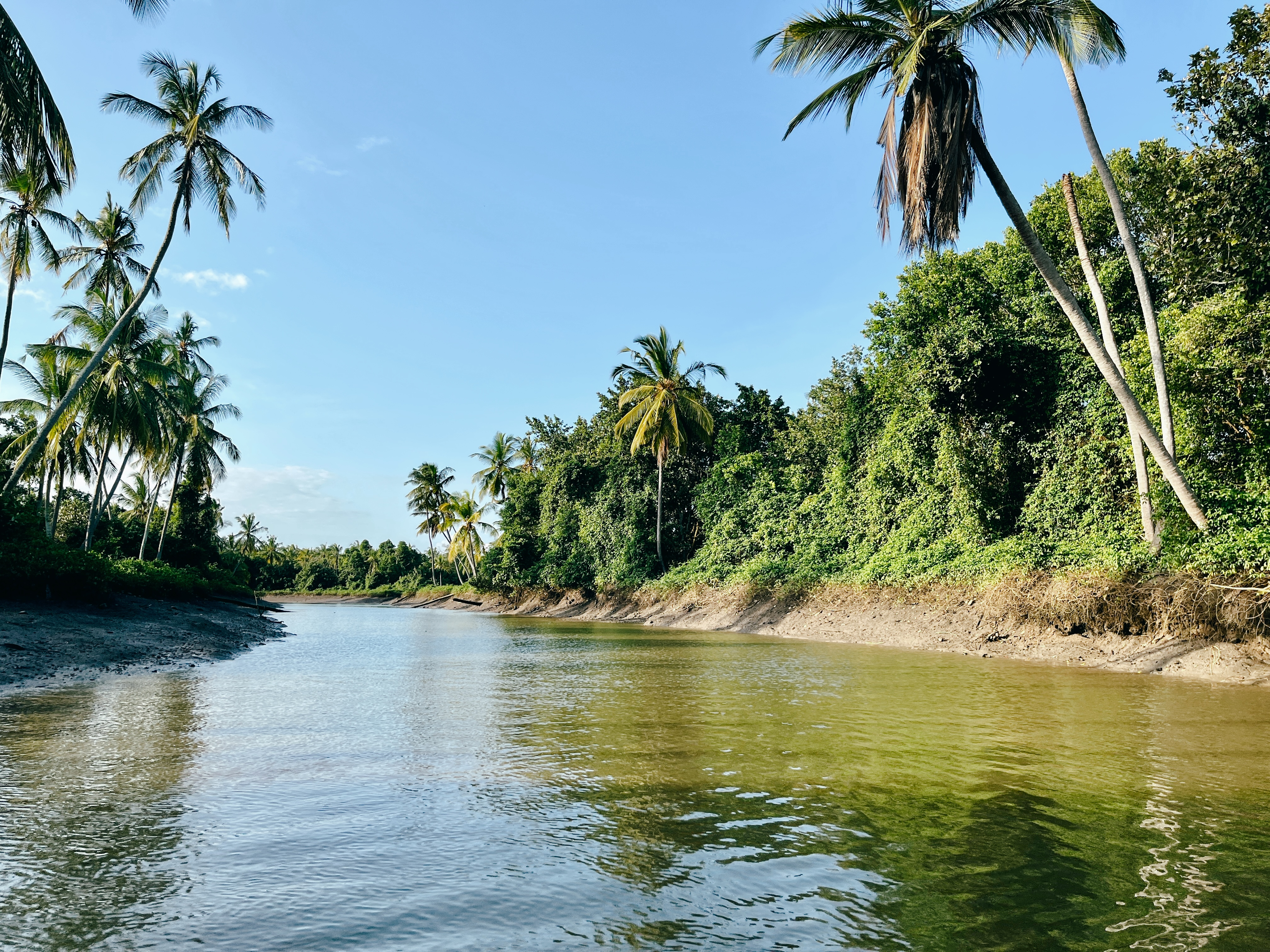
Pangani River through Bushiri ward of Pangani District

Midsection

It is navigable for small craft between the lake and the Höhnel Cataracts, a series of rapids. Below the Höhnel Cataracts, it has numerous tributaries, and many islands with villages on them. The stream is strongest above Koleni, within 5 miles of the Pangani Falls, where the river is narrow. This section is not navigable for any considerable distance on account of the falls, which are about 30 miles (48 km) from the mouth. Approximately 4 miles (6.4 km) from the mouth, dense mangrove swamp covers the flatland between the hills on either side. In this area, near Teufelsfelsen, are higher land, a fertile area, and the arid Masai Steppe. On this bank is Mount Kovu Kovu, 360 feet (110 m) in height, while on the south bank is a ridge 400 feet (120 m) high. Pombwe, one of the principal settlements on the river, is situated about 1 mile (1.6 km) west of Kovu Kovu. Above Pombwe, the West African oil palm grows, while below Pombwe, the trees are chiefly areca and coconut palms. The village of Lemkuna and the hamlet of Ngage are on the river's west bank, while Mvungwe and Meserani are on its eastern bank.

Mouth

The mouth is located 52 kilometres (32 mi) south of Tanga. The river is tidal for a distance of 22 miles (35 km) from the entrance. The southern side of the entrance is marked by a perpendicular bluff named Bweni, about 200 feet (61 m) high; there is a village of the same name, Bweni, situated here. The northern side of the entrance is a flat sandy beach that extends from the head of the bay. There are several settlements at the entrance, two on the northern and two on the southern bank. Historically, the town of Pangani, on the river's left bank, had a reputation for fevers. At its estuary, by Pangani town, the river is about 600 feet (180 m) in breadth, and 12–15 feet (3.7–4.6 m) deep.

Tributaries

Several tributaries coming from the Pare Mountains, the Usambara Mountains and the Wasegiia wilderness join the Pangani in its course. These include the Kibaya, Komkuza, Kwachigulu, Kwamwadyau and Mnyusi.

== Hydrometry ==
Average monthly flow of Pangani measured at the hydrological station in Korogwe Estate, about 110 km above the mouth in m³ / s (1959–77). The Pangani flows stimulate time-dependent, like most rivers in the region.

== Pangani Basin ==
The Pangani Basin (PB) is one of Tanzania's nine drainage basins. Extending from the northern highlands to Tanzania's north-eastern coastline, the PB is approximately 56,300 square kilometres (21,700 sq mi) in size, of which 4,880 square kilometres (1,880 sq mi) is within Kenya. Five sub-basins comprise the basin: the Pangani River (43,650 square kilometres (16,850 sq mi)), the Umba River (8,070 square kilometres (3,120 sq mi)), the Msangazi River (5,030 square kilometres (1,940 sq mi)), the Zigi River, and the Mkulumuzi River plus other coastal rivers (2,080 square kilometres (800 sq mi)). All of these empty into the Indian Ocean.

The Pangani Basin Water Board (PBWB) was established in July 1991 under the Water Utilization (Control and Regulation) Act No. 42 of 1974. Its headquarters is in the Moshi municipality in the Kilimanjaro Region. Its other two offices are in Arusha and Tanga. The PBWB consists of ten professionals from public institutions and private sector LGAs, UWSAs, and other committees.

The river system is under pressure because of conflicting water uses and major overallocations of its water. Many farmers rely on the river for irrigation. Damming projects along the river have reduced the river's flow from several hundred cubic metres per second to less than 40 cubic metres per second (1,400 cu ft/s). This has affected coastal communities, which have seen large reductions in fish populations and saltwater intrusion In 2002, the Pangani River Basin Management Project was established to manage the basin's water resources. It receives technical assistance from the International Union for Conservation of Nature (IUCN), the SNV Netherlands Development Organisation, the GIZ German Development Organisation and the local non-governmental organization PAMOJA. The project also receives funds from the government of Tanzania, IUCN, the European Commission, and the Global Environment Facility through the United Nations Development Programme.

== Commerce ==
There is a good deal of trade here, dhows loading and unloading on the river. Produce is brought down the river, principally on rafts made of the Moale palm, which are then broken up and become articles of commerce. In 1878, the most common crop cultivated on the river's banks was reported to be sugar.
