= List of rivers of Tanzania =

This is a very partial list of rivers of Tanzania

== By drainage basin ==
Rivers of Tanzania listed by drainage basin:

=== East Coast ===
- Gonda River
- Kombe River
- Msimbazi River
- Mkulumuzi River
- Kigombe River
- Mafreta River
- Umba River basin
  - Mbalamu River
- Sigi River basin
- Pangani River basin
  - Kolungazao River
  - Vunda River
  - Mkongore River
    - Kihengere River
  - Saunyi River
    - Luhoroto River
  - Luengera River
  - Mkomazi River (Kilimanjaro)
    - Kambaga River
  - Nyumba ya Mungu Reservoir
    - Kisangara River
    - Kikuletwa River
      - Sanya River
        - Lawate River
        - Fuka River
        - Rau River
      - Weru Weru River
        - Kikafu River
        - Waramu River
      - Usa River
      - Tengeru River
      - Maji ya Chai River
      - Kingori River
      - Nduruma River
      - Themi River
      - Ngare Olmotoni River
      - Lorekale River
      - Terat River
        - Ngarenaro River
        - Burka River
        - Naura River
    - Ruvu Jipe River
      - Himo River
      - Deho River
      - Mwanga River
      - Rau River
      - Mue River
        - Lake Jipe
          - River Lumi, Tanzania
- Msangazi River basin
  - Mgimbo River
  - Chogera River
- Migasi River basin
- Wami River basin
  - Lukigura River
  - Kiseru River
  - Mkundi River
  - Tani River
  - Mkata River
    - Mkondoa River
    - Miyombo River
- Ruvu River basin
  - Vianzi River
  - Vianzi River
  - Msumbiji River
  - Usigwa River
  - Vianzi River
  - Mkombezi River
  - Mbiki River
  - Nduati River
  - Msua River
  - Mlandizi River
  - Ngerengere River
  - Mgeta River
  - Lete River
- Mkusa River
  - Kerenge River
- Mpiji River
- Mbezi River
- Sinza River
- Msimbazi River
- Luhule River
  - Ndilila River
- Rufiji River basin
  - Ruhoi River
  - Lungonya River
  - Lambo River
  - Gumba River
  - Lukuiro River
  - Kidete River
  - Mhangasi River
  - Namkonga River
  - Miwasi River
  - Njenje River
  - Mbarangandu River
  - Liwengu River
    - Horobo River
    - Mtimbiri River
    - Ngangata River
    - Likuyu River
  - Ligombe River
    - Lungonya River
      - Namamba River
  - Great Ruaha River
    - Lukosi River
    - Mbungu River
    - Kizigo River
      - Njombe River
    - Little Ruaha River
    - Kimbi River
    - Mbarali River
    - Mlomboji River
    - Kimani River
    - Ipera River
  - Luwegu River
  - Ulanga River (Kilombero)
    - Kihansi River
    - Luhombero River
    - Msolwa River
    - Ruipa River
    - Mnyera River
      - Ruhudji River
- Muira River
  - Kitandawala River
  - Umira River
- Matandu River basin
  - Liwale River
  - Nganga River
  - Namatete River
  - Murembwi River
  - Malembo River
  - Mitondo River
- Mavuji River basin
- Mbwemkuru River basin
  - Kitopa River
  - Pindiro River
  - Nakiu River
  - Boles River
  - Merui River
  - Chinguaduli River
  - Lingenyeni River
  - Ngadi River
  - Kiperere River
  - Lipuya River
    - Namakenga River
  - Lihonja River
  - Kihatu River
    - Lihula River
    - Mbondo River
  - Lirombe River
    - Ngurumahiga River
    - Namakenga River
  - Liweli River
  - Ruhuu River
    - Ligunga River
  - Kinule River
    - Angai River
    - Lishijiri River
  - Mahenela River
    - Nakawale River
  - Lumesule River
- Lukuledi River basin
  - Luwega River
- Mbua River (Mtwara) basin
  - Mutumnadi River
  - Mkundi River
- Mambi River basin
- Ruvuma River basin
  - Lukwika River
  - Muhuwezi River
    - Ligoma River
    - Nampunga River
    - Makungwe River
  - Msinejewe River
  - Lukumbule River
  - Msangesi River
  - Njuga River
  - Kitama River
  - Mchauru River
    - Mkoo River
  - Mwiti River
    - Lulindi River
    - Mjembe River
  - Miesi River
    - Katipindi River
  - Mbangala River
    - Chimbo River (Mtwara)
  - Lukwamba River
  - Lumesule River
    - Ruanda River
  - Sasawara River
  - Msangesi River
    - Makungo River
  - Ligunga River
  - Mironji River
  - Likonde River
    - Njuga River
      - Mpira River
      - Mhungu River
  - Lupambo River
  - Njoka River
  - Muhukuru River
  - Lunyere River
  - Mkurusi River
  - Lumene River

=== Zambezi basin ===
- Lake Malawi
  - Kiwira River
  - Ruhuhu River
  - Songwe River
  - Lumbira River
  - Kilondo River
  - Lwika River
  - Mzuzuma River
  - Luvangala River

=== Nile basin ===
- Lake Victoria
  - Mori River
  - Mara River
  - Ruwana River
  - Simiyu River
  - Isanga River
  - Kagera River

=== Congo Basin ===
- Lake Tanganyika
  - Malagarasi River
  - Rufugu River
  - Luegele River
  - Luega River
  - Msenguse River
  - Ifume River
  - Luamfi River
  - Loasi River
  - Kalambo River

=== Endorheic basins ===
- Lake Balangida
- Lake Balangida Lelu
- Lake Burunge basin
  - Tarangire River
- Lake Eyasi basin
  - Sibiti River
    - Lake Kitangiri
      - Wembere River
      - Manonga River
- Lake Manyara basin
- Lake Natron basin
  - Peninj River
- Lake Rukwa basin
  - Kavuu River
  - Rungwa River
  - Zira River
    - Songwe River (Rukwa basin)
  - Momba River
    - Saisi River
- Lake Singida
- Lake Sulunga basin
  - Bubu River
  - Mponde River
- Yaeda Swamp
  - Yaeda River

== C ==
1. Cheli River

== K ==
1. Kagera River
2. Kalambo River

== L ==
1. Lukuledi River
2. Lumi River

== M ==
1. Malagarasi River
2. Manonga River
3. Mara River

== P ==
1. Pangani River

== R ==
1. Rufiji River
2. Rurubu River
3. Ruvuma River
4. Ruvyironza River

== S ==
1. Semu River
2. Sibiti River
3. Songwe River

== T ==
1. Tarangire River

== U ==
1. Umba River (Tanzania)

== W ==
1. Wami River
2. Wembere River

== Z ==
1. Zigi River
