= Southern Eastern Rift =

Kenyan-Tanzanian freshwater ecoregion

The Southern Eastern Rift is a freshwater ecoregion in Kenya and Tanzania.

It occupies the southern end of the Eastern Rift Valley, or Gregory Rift, and includes a number of closed or endorheic basins which drain into central lakes with no outlet to the sea.

The Southern Eastern Rift extends 700 km, from central Kenya to Central Tanzania. The Eastern Rift Valley is 50 to 100 km wide for most of its length, but widens out at its southern end.

The lake basins are, from north to south, Lake Baringo, Lake Bogoria, Lake Nakuru, Lake Naivasha, Lake Elementaita, and Lake Magadi in Kenya, and Lake Natron, Lake Manyara, Lake Burungi, Lake Eyasi, Lake Kitangiri, Lake Balangida, Lake Singida, and Lake Sulunga in Tanzania.

In the Kenyan portion of the Southern Eastern Rift, Northern Acacia–Commiphora bushlands and thickets occupies the rift valley floor, with East African montane forests along the high eastern and western escarpments. In the Tanzanian portion, Serengeti volcanic grasslands occur east and west of the Ngorongoro Highlands. The plateau itself, along with Mount Meru and Mount Kilimanjaro, are covered in East African montane forests. Further south, Southern Acacia–Commiphora bushlands and thickets occupy the Tarangire River valley, the basin of Lake Sulunga, and the lowlands south and west of Lake Eyasi. Miombo woodlands occupy the southern and eastern watershed of the Wembere River and the Mbulu Highlands, which divide the Lake Eyasi basin from the Lake Manyara, Tarangire, and Lake Sulunga lowlands. Enclaves of East African montane forest occur at higher elevations in the Mbulu Highlands and Mount Hanang. In the Itigi District are Itigi–Sumbu thickets.
