= Umba =

Umba may refer to

- Umba, Russia, an urban-type settlement in Murmansk Oblast, Russia
- Umba (White Sea), a river on the Kola Peninsula, Russia
- Umba River (Tanzania), a river in Tanzania
- Umba sapphire, a sapphire from Tanzania
- Umba Valley, a valley in Tanzania
- Umba, Papua New Guinea, a town and airport in Papua New Guinea
