= Geography of Tanzania =

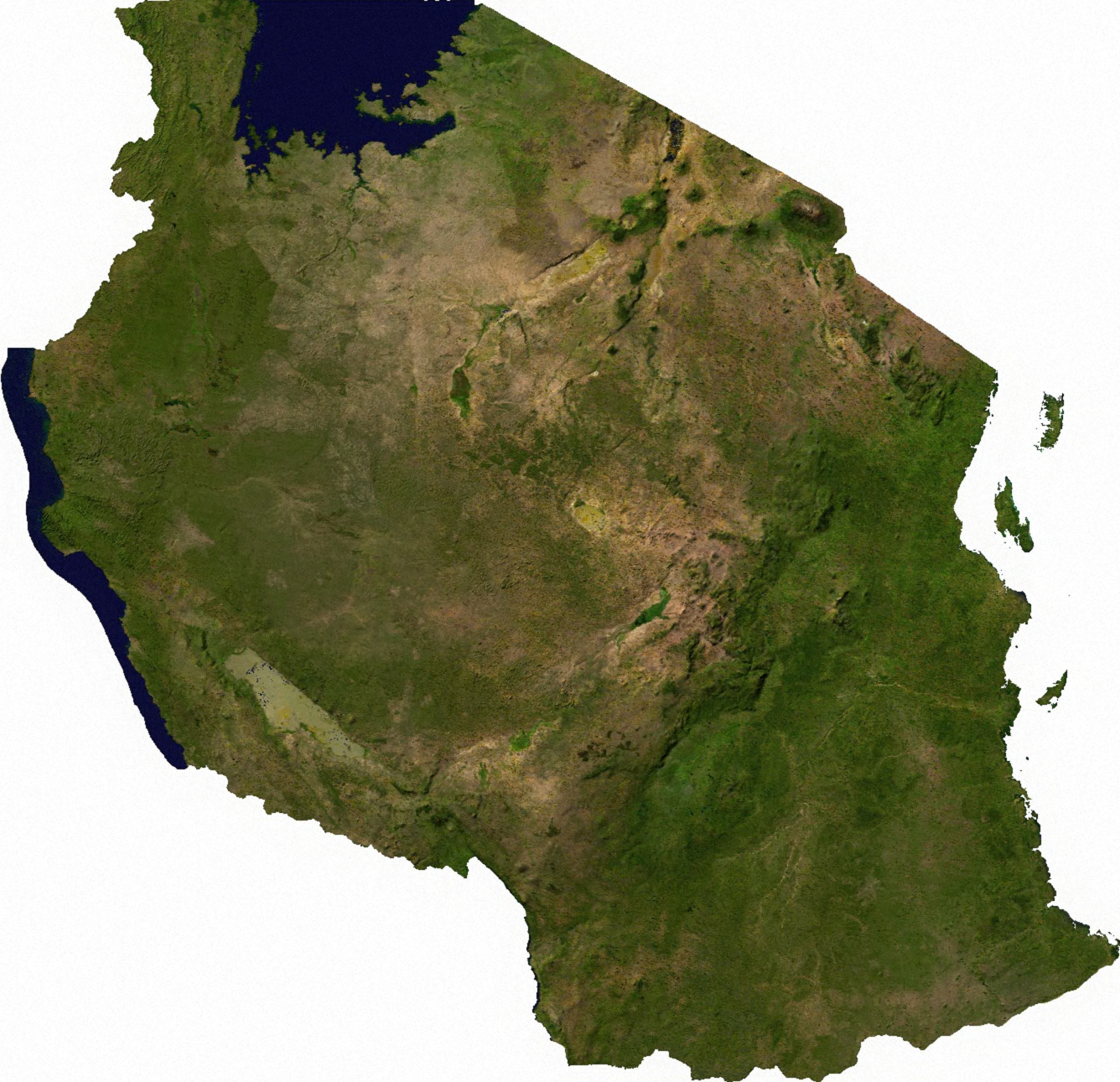
- Continent: Africa
- Region: East Africa
- Coordinates: 6°00′S 35°00′E
- Area: Ranked 30th
  - Total: 945,087 km^{2} (364,900 sq mi)
  - Land: 93.51%
  - Water: 6.49%
- Coastline: 1,424 km (885 mi)
- Borders: 4,161 km (2,586 mi)
- Highest point: Mount Kilimanjaro; 5,895 metres (19,341 ft)
- Lowest point: Indian Ocean; 0 metres (0 ft)
- Longest river: Rufiji River; 600 km (370 mi)
- Largest lake: Lake Victoria 59,947 km^{2} (23,146 mi^{2})
- Exclusive economic zone: 241,888 km^{2} (93,393 mi^{2})

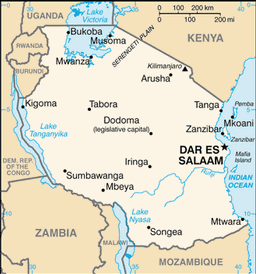
Map of Tanzania

Location of Tanzania

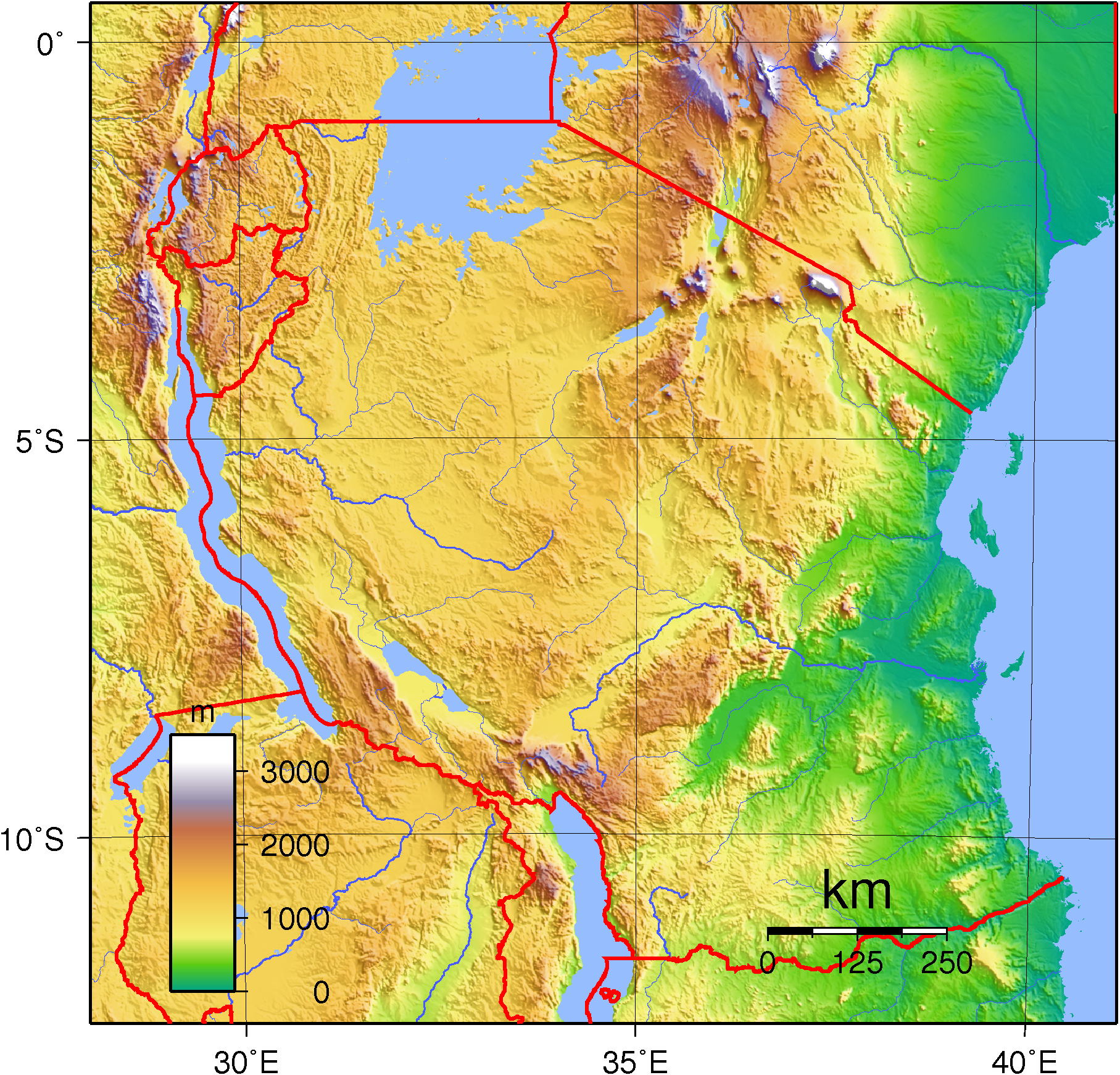
Topographic map of Tanzania

Köppen climate classification map of Tanzania

Tanzania comprises many lakes, national parks, and Africa's highest point, Mount Kilimanjaro (5,895 m or 19,341 ft). Northeast Tanzania is mountainous, while the central area is part of a large plateau covered in grasslands. The country also contains the southern portion of Lake Victoria on its northern border with Uganda and Kenya.

Administratively, Tanzania is divided into 31 regions, with twenty-five on the mainland, three on Unguja (known informally as Zanzibar Island), and two on Pemba Island.

== Statistics ==
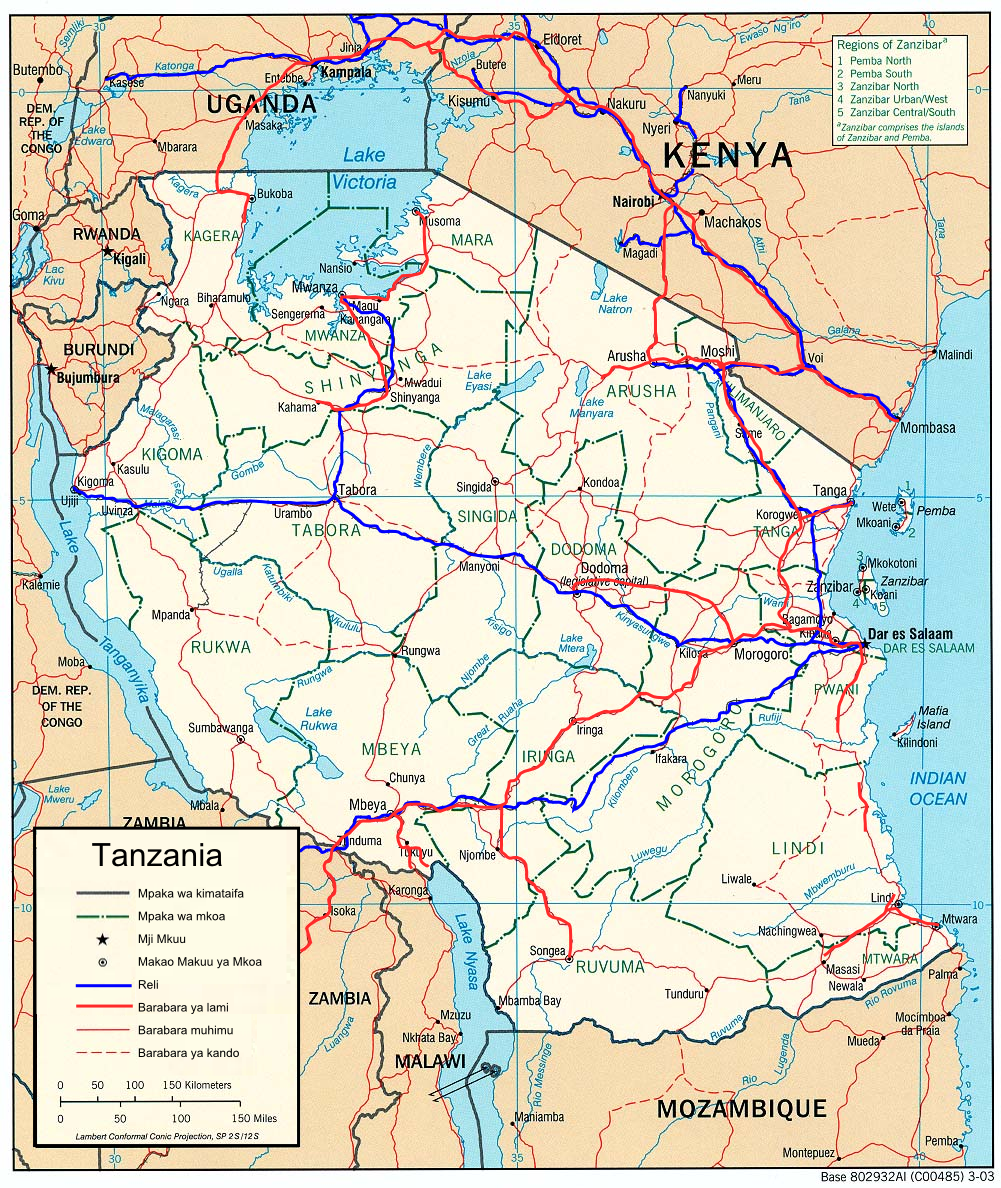
Road map of Tanzania

Location: Eastern Africa, bordering the Indian Ocean, between Kenya and Mozambique.

Geographic coordinates: 6°00′S 35°00′E

Continent: Africa

Area:
note: includes the islands of Mafia, Pemba, and Unguja

- total: 947,300 square kilometres (365,800 sq mi)
- land: 885,800 square kilometres (342,000 sq mi)
- water: 61,500 square kilometres (23,700 sq mi)

Area comparative
- Australia comparative: slightly smaller than South Australia
- Canada comparative: approximately the size of British Columbia
- United States comparative: approximately three times the size of New Mexico
- EU comparative: slightly more than three times the size of Poland

Land boundaries:

- total: 3,861 kilometres (2,399 mi)
- border countries: Burundi 451 kilometres (280 mi), Kenya 769 kilometres (478 mi), Malawi 475 kilometres (295 mi), Mozambique 756 kilometres (470 mi), Rwanda 217 kilometres (135 mi), Uganda 396 kilometres (246 mi), Zambia 338 kilometres (210 mi), Democratic Republic of the Congo 459 kilometres (285 mi)

Coastline: 1,424 kilometres (885 mi)

Maritime claims:

- exclusive economic zone: 241,888 km^{2} (93,393 mi^{2}) and 200 nmi (370.4 km; 230.2 mi)
- territorial sea: 12 nmi (22.2 km; 13.8 mi)

Terrain: plains along coast; central plateau; highlands in north, south

Elevation extremes:

- lowest point: Indian Ocean 0 m
- highest point: Mount Kilimanjaro 5,895 metres (19,341 ft)

Natural resources: hydropower, tin, phosphates, iron ore, coal, diamonds, gemstones, gold, natural gas, nickel

Land use:

- arable land: 12.25%
- permanent crops: 1.79%
- other: 85.96% (2011)

Irrigated land: 1,843 square kilometres (712 sq mi) (2003)

Total renewable water resources: 96.27 cubic kilometres (23.10 cu mi) (2011)

Natural hazards:

- flooding on the central plateau during the rainy season; drought
- volcanism: limited volcano activity; Ol Doinyo Lengai (elevation 2,962 metres (9,718 ft)) has emitted lava in recent years; other historically active volcanoes include Kieyo and Meru

Environment - current issues: soil degradation; deforestation; desertification; destruction of coral reef threatens marine habitats; recent droughts affected marginal agriculture; wildlife threatened by illegal hunting and trade, especially for ivory

Environment - international agreements:

- party to:
  - Biodiversity
  - United Nations Framework Convention on Climate Change
  - Kyoto Protocol to the United Nations Framework Convention on Climate Change
  - United Nations Convention to Combat Desertification in Those Countries Experiencing Serious Drought and/or Desertification, Particularly in Africa
  - Convention on International Trade in Endangered Species of Wild Fauna and Flora
  - Basel Convention on the Control of Transboundary Movements of Hazardous Wastes and Their Disposal
  - United Nations Convention on the Law of the Sea
  - Vienna Convention for the Protection of the Ozone Layer
  - Convention on Wetlands of International Importance, especially as Waterfowl Habitat

== Physical Geography ==
Northeast Tanzania exhibits a mountainous terrain and includes Mount Meru, an active volcano, Mount Kilimanjaro, a dormant volcano, and the Usambara and Pare mountain ranges. Kilimanjaro attracts thousands of tourists each year. West of those mountains is the Gregory Rift, which is the eastern arm of the Great Rift Valley. On the floor of the rift are a number of large salt lakes, including Natron in the north, Manyara in the south, and Eyasi in the southwest. The rift also encompasses the Crater Highlands, which includes the Ngorongoro Conservation Area and the Ngorongoro Crater. Just to the south of Lake Natron is Ol Doinyo Lengai with an elevation of 3,188 m (10,459 ft), the world's only active volcano to produce natrocarbonatite lava. To the west of the Crater Highlands lies Serengeti National Park, which is famous for its lions, leopards, elephants, rhinoceroses, and buffalo plus the annual migration of millions of white bearded wildebeest. Just to the southeast of the park is Olduvai Gorge, where many of the oldest hominid fossils and artifacts have been found.

Further northwest is Lake Victoria on the Kenya–Uganda–Tanzania border. This is the largest lake in Africa by surface area and is traditionally named as the source of the Nile River. Southwest of this, separating Tanzania from the Democratic Republic of the Congo, is Lake Tanganyika. This lake is estimated to be the second deepest lake in the world after Lake Baikal in Siberia. The western portion of the country between Lakes Victoria, Tanganyika, and Malawi consists of flat land that has been categorised by the World Wildlife Fund as part of the Central Zambezian miombo woodlands ecoregion. Just upstream from the Kalambo Falls, there is one of the most important archaeological sites in Africa. Tanzania's Southern Highlands are in the southwestern part of the country, around the northern end of Lake Malawi. Mbeya is the largest city in the Southern Highlands.

The centre of Tanzania is a large plateau, which is part of the East African Plateau. The southern half of this plateau is grassland within the Eastern miombo woodlands ecoregion, the majority of which is covered by the huge Selous National Park. Further north the plateau is arable land and includes the national capital, Dodoma.

The eastern coast contains Tanzania's largest city and former capital, Dar es Salaam. Just north of this city lies the Zanzibar Archipelago, a semi-autonomous territory of Tanzania which is famous for its spices. The coast is home to areas of East African mangroves, mangrove swamps that are an important habitat for wildlife on land and in the water. A recent global remote sensing analysis suggested that there were 1,256km² of tidal flats in Tanzania, making it the 26th ranked country in terms of tidal flat area.

=== Watersheds ===
Eastern and central Tanzania are drained by rivers that empty into the Indian Ocean. The major rivers are, from north to south, the Pangani, Wami, Ruvu, Rufiji, Matandu, Mbwemkuru, and the Ruvuma River, which forms the southern border with Mozambique. The longest of these is the Rufiji.

Most of Northern Tanzania drains into Lake Victoria, which empties into the Nile River.

The western portion of Tanzania is in the watershed of Lake Tanganyika, which drains into the Congo River. The Malagarasi River is the largest tributary of Lake Tanganyika.

Part of southwestern Tanzania drains into Lake Malawi, which empties south into the Zambezi River.

The Southern Eastern Rift area of north-central Tanzania is made up of several endorheic basins, which have no outlet to the sea and drain into salt and/or alkaline lakes. Lake Rukwa in west-central Tanzania, is another endorheic basin.

== Climate ==
Tanzania has a mainly tropical climate but has regional variations due to topography. In the highlands, temperatures range between 10 and 20 °C (50 and 68 °F) during cold and hot seasons respectively and a subtropical highland climate is found. The rest of the country has temperatures rarely falling lower than 20 °C (68 °F). The hottest period extends between November and February (25–31 °C or 77.0–87.8 °F) while the coldest period occurs between May and August (15–20 °C or 59–68 °F).

Seasonal rainfall is driven mainly by the migration of the Intertropical Convergence Zone. It migrates southwards through Tanzania in October to December, reaching the south of the country in January and February, and returning northwards in March, April, and May. This causes the north and east of Tanzania to experience two distinct wet periods – the short rains (or "Vuli") in October to December and the long rains (or "Masika") from March to May – while the southern, western, and central parts of the country experience one wet season that continues October through to April or May. Some inland areas of Tanzania have a hot semi-arid climate.

Across Tanzania, the onset of the long rains averages 25 March and the cessation averages 21 May. A warmer-than-normal South Atlantic Ocean coupled with a cooler-than-normal Eastern Indian Ocean often causes the onset to be delayed.

=== Examples ===
Climate data for Dar es Salaam
Month	Jan	Feb	Mar	Apr	May	Jun	Jul	Aug	Sep	Oct	Nov	Dec	Year
Record high °C (°F)	35.0 (95.0)	35.2 (95.4)	35.0 (95.0)	35.0 (95.0)	32.9 (91.2)	33.0 (91.4)	31.8 (89.2)	31.9 (89.4)	33.8 (92.8)	33.7 (92.7)	34.0 (93.2)	34.5 (94.1)	35.2 (95.4)
Mean daily maximum °C (°F)	31.8 (89.2)	32.4 (90.3)	32.1 (89.8)	30.7 (87.3)	29.8 (85.6)	29.3 (84.7)	28.9 (84.0)	29.4 (84.9)	30.3 (86.5)	30.9 (87.6)	31.4 (88.5)	31.6 (88.9)	30.7 (87.3)
Mean daily minimum °C (°F)	23.5 (74.3)	23.3 (73.9)	22.8 (73.0)	22.4 (72.3)	21.3 (70.3)	19.2 (66.6)	18.2 (64.8)	18.1 (64.6)	18.4 (65.1)	19.7 (67.5)	21.3 (70.3)	22.8 (73.0)	20.9 (69.6)
Record low °C (°F)	18.1 (64.6)	18.4 (65.1)	19.6 (67.3)	19.6 (67.3)	16.2 (61.2)	14.4 (57.9)	13.7 (56.7)	12.8 (55.0)	14.3 (57.7)	15.8 (60.4)	17.6 (63.7)	18.8 (65.8)	12.8 (55.0)
Average rainfall mm (inches)	76.3 (3.00)	54.9 (2.16)	138.1 (5.44)	254.2 (10.01)	197.8 (7.79)	42.9 (1.69)	25.6 (1.01)	24.1 (0.95)	22.8 (0.90)	69.3 (2.73)	125.9 (4.96)	117.8 (4.64)	1,149.7 (45.26)
Average rainy days (≥ 1.0 mm)	7	4	11	18	13	5	4	4	3	5	8	9	91
Average relative humidity (%)	77	76	80	84	81	78	77	76	75	76	78	78	79
Mean monthly sunshine hours	235.6	223.2	213.9	156.0	213.9	222.0	223.2	266.6	252.0	275.9	252.0	241.8	2,776.1
Mean daily sunshine hours	7.6	7.9	6.9	5.2	6.9	7.4	7.2	8.6	8.4	8.9	8.4	7.8	7.6
Source 1: World Meteorological Organization
Source 2: Deutscher Wetterdienst (extremes, humidity, and sun)

Climate data for Dodoma (1971–2000)
Month	Jan	Feb	Mar	Apr	May	Jun	Jul	Aug	Sep	Oct	Nov	Dec	Year
Record high °C (°F)	35.3 (95.5)	36.0 (96.8)	33.5 (92.3)	32.7 (90.9)	32.9 (91.2)	31.7 (89.1)	31.1 (88.0)	34.1 (93.4)	33.8 (92.8)	36.1 (97.0)	36.0 (96.8)	36.4 (97.5)	36.4 (97.5)
Mean daily maximum °C (°F)	29.4 (84.9)	29.4 (84.9)	29.0 (84.2)	28.7 (83.7)	28.0 (82.4)	27.1 (80.8)	26.5 (79.7)	27.3 (81.1)	29.0 (84.2)	30.5 (86.9)	30.1 (86.2)	30.4 (86.7)	28.8 (83.8)
Mean daily minimum °C (°F)	18.6 (65.5)	18.6 (65.5)	18.3 (64.9)	17.9 (64.2)	16.5 (61.7)	14.4 (57.9)	13.6 (56.5)	14.2 (57.6)	15.3 (59.5)	16.9 (62.4)	18.3 (64.9)	18.8 (65.8)	16.5 (61.7)
Record low °C (°F)	15.7 (60.3)	16.2 (61.2)	14.9 (58.8)	14.9 (58.8)	10.3 (50.5)	8.9 (48.0)	7.6 (45.7)	9.3 (48.7)	11.1 (52.0)	13.0 (55.4)	14.4 (57.9)	14.4 (57.9)	7.6 (45.7)
Average rainfall mm (inches)	133.7 (5.26)	144.5 (5.69)	113.9 (4.48)	57.8 (2.28)	5.3 (0.21)	0.1 (0.00)	0.03 (0.00)	0.01 (0.00)	0.01 (0.00)	2.08 (0.08)	26.25 (1.03)	123.28 (4.85)	606.96 (23.90)
Average rainy days (≥ 1.0 mm)	10	9	7	5	1	0	0	0	0	0	2	7	41
Average relative humidity (%)	66	68	70	68	63	60	59	58	55	53	55	63	62
Source 1: World Meteorological Organization
Source 2: Deutscher Wetterdienst (extremes and humidity)

Climate data for Arusha
Month	Jan	Feb	Mar	Apr	May	Jun	Jul	Aug	Sep	Oct	Nov	Dec	Year
Mean daily maximum °C (°F)	28 (82)	28 (82)	27 (81)	25 (77)	22 (72)	21 (70)	20 (68)	22 (72)	24 (75)	26 (79)	27 (81)	27 (81)	25 (77)
Daily mean °C (°F)	19 (66)	19 (66)	19 (66)	19 (66)	16 (61)	14 (57)	14 (57)	15 (59)	16 (61)	18 (64)	18 (64)	18 (64)	17 (63)
Mean daily minimum °C (°F)	10 (50)	10 (50)	11 (52)	13 (55)	11 (52)	8 (46)	9 (48)	8 (46)	8 (46)	10 (50)	10 (50)	10 (50)	10 (50)
Average rainfall mm (inches)	50 (2.0)	80 (3.1)	170 (6.7)	360 (14.2)	210 (8.3)	30 (1.2)	10 (0.4)	10 (0.4)	20 (0.8)	30 (1.2)	110 (4.3)	100 (3.9)	1,180 (46.5)
Source: Weatherbase

Climate data for Mwanza
Month	Jan	Feb	Mar	Apr	May	Jun	Jul	Aug	Sep	Oct	Nov	Dec	Year
Record high °C (°F)	35.0 (95.0)	35.0 (95.0)	36.6 (97.9)	34.0 (93.2)	35.6 (96.1)	35.0 (95.0)	34.0 (93.2)	34.2 (93.6)	34.5 (94.1)	36.0 (96.8)	35.6 (96.1)	34.2 (93.6)	36.6 (97.9)
Mean daily maximum °C (°F)	27.6 (81.7)	27.9 (82.2)	28.5 (83.3)	27.8 (82.0)	28.1 (82.6)	28.4 (83.1)	28.3 (82.9)	28.7 (83.7)	29.0 (84.2)	28.5 (83.3)	27.5 (81.5)	27.3 (81.1)	28.1 (82.6)
Daily mean °C (°F)	23.5 (74.3)	23.2 (73.8)	23.5 (74.3)	23.3 (73.9)	23.4 (74.1)	22.9 (73.2)	22.4 (72.3)	23.2 (73.8)	23.8 (74.8)	24.3 (75.7)	23.9 (75.0)	23.3 (73.9)	23.4 (74.1)
Mean daily minimum °C (°F)	17.7 (63.9)	17.8 (64.0)	18.0 (64.4)	18.2 (64.8)	17.7 (63.9)	16.2 (61.2)	15.4 (59.7)	16.4 (61.5)	17.3 (63.1)	18.1 (64.6)	18.1 (64.6)	17.9 (64.2)	17.4 (63.3)
Record low °C (°F)	10.8 (51.4)	11.0 (51.8)	14.0 (57.2)	14.0 (57.2)	13.0 (55.4)	12.0 (53.6)	11.0 (51.8)	11.0 (51.8)	13.0 (55.4)	13.0 (55.4)	10.8 (51.4)	12.0 (53.6)	10.8 (51.4)
Average rainfall mm (inches)	103.7 (4.08)	108.0 (4.25)	139.8 (5.50)	168.2 (6.62)	72.9 (2.87)	21.1 (0.83)	11.9 (0.47)	20.6 (0.81)	22.9 (0.90)	85.6 (3.37)	157.2 (6.19)	138.9 (5.47)	1,050.7 (41.37)
Average rainy days (≥ 1.0 mm)	10	8	11	14	8	2	1	2	3	8	13	12	92
Average relative humidity (%)	71	71	69	74	70	66	58	58	59	61	71	73	67
Mean monthly sunshine hours	229.4	211.9	235.6	231.0	254.2	282.0	285.2	266.6	252.0	241.8	210.0	223.2	2,922.9
Mean daily sunshine hours	7.4	7.5	7.6	7.7	8.2	9.4	9.2	8.6	8.4	7.8	7.0	7.2	8.0
Source 1: World Meteorological Organization
Source 2: Deutscher Wetterdienst (extremes, means, humidity, and sun)

Climate data for Zanzibar City
Month	Jan	Feb	Mar	Apr	May	Jun	Jul	Aug	Sep	Oct	Nov	Dec	Year
Mean daily maximum °C (°F)	33.4 (92.1)	34.1 (93.4)	34.2 (93.6)	31.7 (89.1)	30.6 (87.1)	30.0 (86.0)	29.3 (84.7)	29.8 (85.6)	31.0 (87.8)	31.7 (89.1)	32.4 (90.3)	33.0 (91.4)	31.8 (89.2)
Daily mean °C (°F)	28.5 (83.3)	28.8 (83.8)	28.8 (83.8)	27.5 (81.5)	26.6 (79.9)	25.9 (78.6)	25.2 (77.4)	25.1 (77.2)	25.6 (78.1)	26.1 (79.0)	27.1 (80.8)	28 (82)	26.9 (80.4)
Mean daily minimum °C (°F)	23.6 (74.5)	23.6 (74.5)	23.5 (74.3)	23.4 (74.1)	22.7 (72.9)	21.8 (71.2)	21.2 (70.2)	20.5 (68.9)	20.2 (68.4)	20.6 (69.1)	21.9 (71.4)	23.1 (73.6)	22.2 (72.0)
Average precipitation mm (inches)	69 (2.7)	65 (2.6)	152 (6.0)	357 (14.1)	262 (10.3)	59 (2.3)	45 (1.8)	44 (1.7)	51 (2.0)	88 (3.5)	177 (7.0)	143 (5.6)	1,512 (59.5)
Source: Climate-Data.org

Climate data for Chake Chake
Month	Jan	Feb	Mar	Apr	May	Jun	Jul	Aug	Sep	Oct	Nov	Dec	Year
Mean daily maximum °C (°F)	30.9 (87.6)	31.6 (88.9)	31.9 (89.4)	30.1 (86.2)	28.9 (84.0)	28.5 (83.3)	27.8 (82.0)	28.1 (82.6)	28.8 (83.8)	29.7 (85.5)	30.2 (86.4)	30.8 (87.4)	29.8 (85.6)
Daily mean °C (°F)	26.8 (80.2)	27.1 (80.8)	27.4 (81.3)	26.3 (79.3)	25.3 (77.5)	24.6 (76.3)	23.7 (74.7)	23.7 (74.7)	24.1 (75.4)	25.0 (77.0)	25.9 (78.6)	26.6 (79.9)	25.5 (77.9)
Mean daily minimum °C (°F)	22.8 (73.0)	22.7 (72.9)	22.9 (73.2)	22.6 (72.7)	21.8 (71.2)	20.7 (69.3)	19.7 (67.5)	19.3 (66.7)	19.5 (67.1)	20.3 (68.5)	21.6 (70.9)	22.5 (72.5)	21.4 (70.5)
Average precipitation mm (inches)	86 (3.4)	71 (2.8)	134 (5.3)	304 (12.0)	291 (11.5)	74 (2.9)	42 (1.7)	27 (1.1)	21 (0.8)	54 (2.1)	129 (5.1)	131 (5.2)	1,364 (53.7)
Source: Climate-Data.org

== Forests ==
=== Tree cover extent and loss ===
Global Forest Watch publishes annual estimates of tree cover loss and 2000 tree cover extent derived from time-series analysis of Landsat satellite imagery in the Global Forest Change dataset. In this framework, tree cover refers to vegetation taller than 5 m (including natural forests and tree plantations), and tree cover loss is defined as the complete removal of tree cover canopy for a given year, regardless of cause.

For Tanzania, country statistics report cumulative tree cover loss of 3,475,734 ha (34,757.34 km^{2}) from 2001 to 2024 (about 13.2% of its 2000 tree cover area). For tree cover density greater than 30%, country statistics report a 2000 tree cover extent of 26,405,606 ha (264,056.06 km^{2}). The charts and table below display this data. In simple terms, the annual loss number is the area where tree cover disappeared in that year, and the extent number shows what remains of the 2000 tree cover baseline after subtracting cumulative loss. Forest regrowth is not included in the dataset.

Annual tree cover loss in Tanzania, 2001–2024. View chart definition.
Tree cover extent in 2000 minus cumulative tree cover loss in Tanzania, 2001–2024 (loss-only residual; does not account for gain). View chart definition.

Annual tree cover extent and loss
Year	Tree cover extent (km2) (Note: This residual measure does not include forest regrowth.)	Annual tree cover loss (km2)
2001	263,233.91	822.15
2002	262,383.11	850.80
2003	261,542.44	840.67
2004	260,873.51	668.93
2005	259,957.67	915.84
2006	259,104.73	852.94
2007	257,887.91	1,216.82
2008	256,245.42	1,642.49
2009	254,811.89	1,433.53
2010	253,427.08	1,384.81
2011	252,049.11	1,377.97
2012	250,504.82	1,544.29
2013	248,689.73	1,815.09
2014	246,707.53	1,982.20
2015	245,587.93	1,119.60
2016	244,059.41	1,528.52
2017	242,110.72	1,948.69
2018	240,393.68	1,717.04
2019	238,965.97	1,427.71
2020	237,103.89	1,862.08
2021	235,453.21	1,650.68
2022	233,846.64	1,606.57
2023	231,556.38	2,290.26
2024	229,298.72	2,257.66

=== REDD+ reference level and monitoring ===
Under the UNFCCC REDD+ framework, Tanzania has submitted a national forest reference emission level (FREL) package. On the UNFCCC REDD+ Web Platform, the country's 2017 submission package is listed as having an assessed reference level, while a national strategy, safeguards information and a national forest monitoring system are all listed as "not reported".

The first assessed FREL, submitted in 2017 and technically assessed in 2018, covered the REDD+ activity "reducing emissions from deforestation". Although presented as national, it was constructed as the sum of subnational FRELs for mainland Tanzania and Zanzibar. Using a 2002-2013 reference period for mainland Tanzania and a 2004-2012 reference period for Zanzibar, the modified and assessed national FREL was 43,736,974 t CO2 eq per year, revised from 58,462,472.67 t CO2 eq per year in the original submission.

The technical assessment states that the benchmark represented the annual average of CO2 emissions from gross deforestation, defined as the change from forest to non-forest cover. It included above-ground biomass, below-ground biomass and deadwood, reported CO2 only, and used a forest definition of at least 1/2 hectare (7,800,000 sq in), minimum tree crown cover of 10 percent, and trees capable of reaching at least 3 metres (9.8 ft) in height at maturity; activity data came from land-use and land-cover change analysis and emission factors from the national forest inventory.

== Specific geographic regions ==
- Menai Bay Conservation Area
- Mount Kilimanjaro
- Mount Meru
- Olduvai Gorge
- Umba Valley

== Extreme points ==
This is a list of the extreme points of Tanzania, the points that are farther north, south, east or west than any other location.

- Northernmost point - unnamed point on the border with Uganda in the Kagera river immediately east of the Ugandan town of Kikagati, Kagera Region
- Easternmost point - Mnazi, Mtwara Region
- Easternmost point (mainland) - unnamed headland immediately east of the town of Mwambo, Mtwara Region
- Southernmost point - unnamed location on the border with Mozambique in the Ruvuma River, Ruvuma Region
- Westernmost point - unnamed headland immediately west of Ujiji, Kigoma Region
