= Synodontis orientalis =

Scientific classification
- Kingdom: Animalia
- Phylum: Chordata
- Class: Actinopterygii
- Order: Siluriformes
- Family: Mochokidae
- Genus: Synodontis
- Species: S. orientalis

Binomial name
- Synodontis orientalis Seegers, 2008

Species of fish

Synodontis orientalis is a species of upside-down catfish endemic to Tanzania, where it occurs in the Ruvu and probably also the Rufiji river basins. This species grows to a length of 8.8 centimetres (3.5 in) SL.
