= Semu River =

River in Tanzania

Coordinates: 3°59′S 34°23′E

Semu River is a river in northern Tanzania, tributary of Sibiti River, among lake Eyasi and lake Kitangiri.
