= List of volcanoes in Tanzania =

This is a list of active and extinct volcanoes in Tanzania.

Name	Elevation		Location	Last eruption
Name	metres	feet	Coordinates	Last eruption
Burko	2136	7008	3.33°S 36.22°E	-
Embulbul	-	-	-	-
Elanairobi	3220	10564	2.92°S 35.83°E	Pleistocene
Esimingor	-	-	-	-
Gelai	-	-	-	-
Igwisi Hills	-	-	4.87°S 31.92°E	Holocene
Izumbwe-Mpoli	1568	5144	8.93°S 33.40°E	Holocene
Ketumbaine	-	-	-	-
Kyejo	2175	7136	9.23°S 33.78°E	1800
Mount Kilimanjaro	5895	19,340	3.07°S 37.35°E	-
Lemagrut	-	-	-	-
Mount Loolmalasin	3682	-	-	-
Meru	4565	14,977	3.25°S 36.75°E	1910
Ngorongoro	-	-	3.15°S 39.30°E	-
Ngozi	2622	8602	8.97°S 33.57°E	Holocene
Ol Doinyo Lengai	2962	9718	2.764°S 35.914°E	2017
Oldeani	3215	10547.9	3.30°S 35.45°E	
Olmoti	2188	7178	2.68°S 37.88°E	Pleistocene
Mount Rungwe	2961	9714	9.13°S 33.67°E	Holocene
Unnamed	-	-	8.63°S 33.57°E	Holocene
Usangu Basin	2179	7149	8.75°S 33.80°E	Holocene

== See also ==
- Lists of volcanoes
