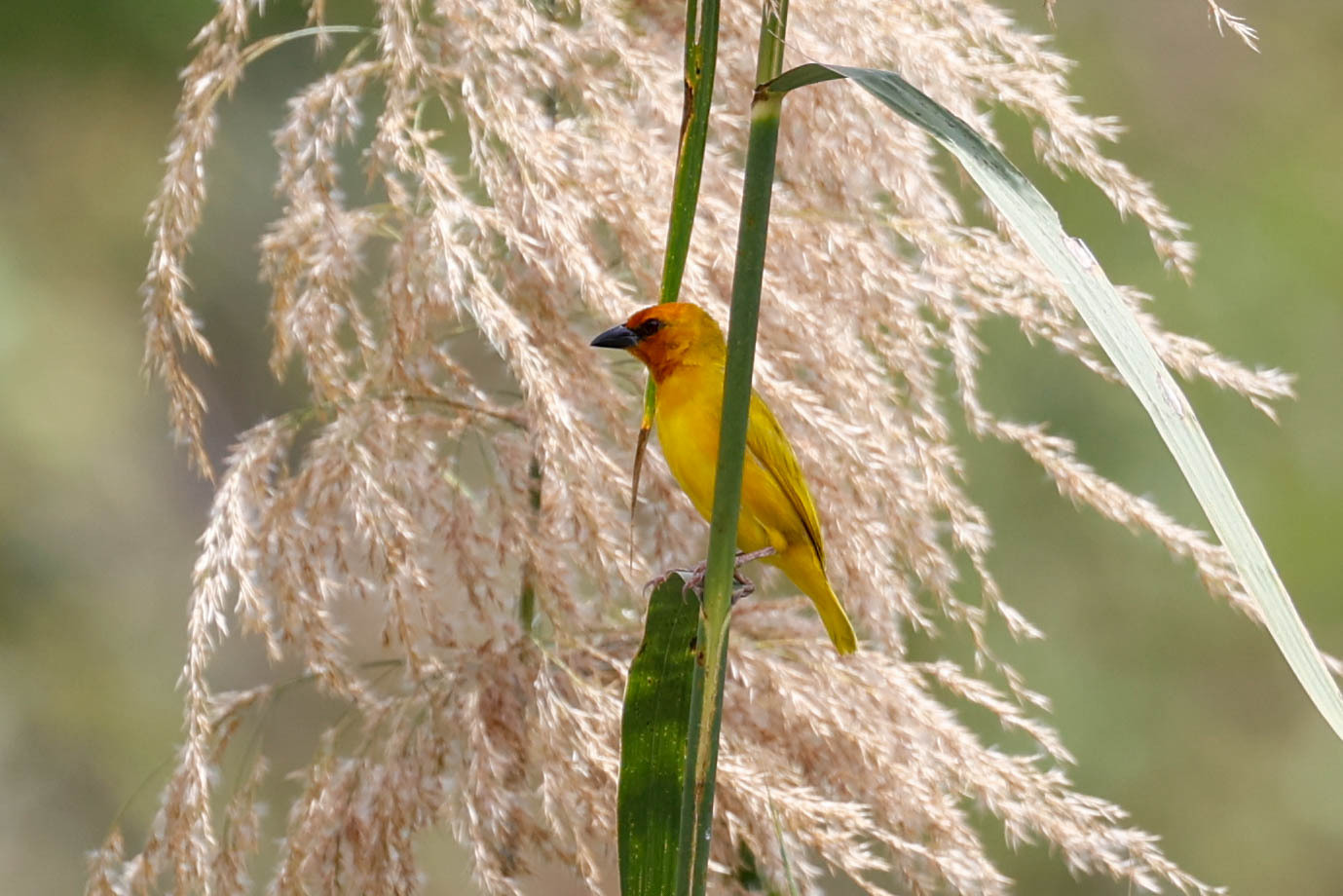

Scientific classification
- Kingdom: Animalia
- Phylum: Chordata
- Class: Aves
- Order: Passeriformes
- Family: Ploceidae
- Genus: Ploceus
- Species: P. holoxanthus

Binomial name
- Ploceus holoxanthus Hartlaub, 1891

= Ruvu weaver =

Bird in the family Ploceidae from eastern and southern Africa

The Ruvu weaver (Ploceus holoxanthus) is a species of songbird in the family Ploceidae. It is endemic to northeastern Tanzania.

== Taxonomy ==
The Ruvu weaver was formally described by Gustav Hartlaub in 1891 from two specimens taken from Mtoni on the Ruvu River, Tanzania, by Friedrich Bohndorff. However, for over a century the species was mistakenly regarded as a synonym of African golden-weaver (P. subaureus), but was reinstated as a unique species following genetic analysis published in 2020. The Ruvu weaver is most closely related to southern brown-throated weaver (P. xanthopterus) and Kilombero weaver (P. burnieri) within the genus Ploceus. Ruvu weaver is monotypic.

The species name holoxanthus means 'entirely yellow', which was given by Hartlaub who deemed the species to be the most yellow of the weavers.

== Description ==
Male Ruvu weavers are bright yellow with an orange face. The dark brown eye is a key distinguishing feature from male African golden-weavers, which have red eyes. The wings of male Ruvu weavers are pale yellow, with the palest plumage on the tertials. Females are olive in colour with a bicoloured bill, dark on the maxilla and pale on the mandible. Ruvu weaver measures 12cm in length and is smaller than African golden-weaver.

== Distribution and habitat ==
The Ruvu weaver has a restricted distribution in Tanzania, being found along the Ruvu, Wami, and Rufiji river basins, including the Selous Game Reserve from Lake Tagalala to the Rufiji River. The species was also recently found on the Ngerengere River near Morogoro, which joins the Ruvu River further east.

The weaver is found in riverine habitat with bushes and reeds, such as bamboos and Phragmites.

== Behaviour ==
=== Breeding ===
Colonies of 4-15 nests have been described, consisting of round woven balls of reeds with one entrance on the underside. Nests are located in bushes or reeds, and males construct the nest with reed blades. Related Ploceus weavers are polygamous, which is also likely for Ruvu weaver but is yet to be determined.

=== Vocalizations ===
The first audio recordings of Ruvu weaver were collected in 2023 near Morogoro, including male courtship, song, and calls. The song of the male is similar to African golden-weaver in tone and is slightly lower in pitch. Male courtship behaviour involves displaying while hanging below a nest, calling rapidly and fluffing body feathers while lowering the wings and fanning the tail. This behaviour is similar to other Ploceus weavers.

== Conservation status ==
There has been no evaluation of the conservation status of Ruvu weaver and the species needs a population assessment. Development of reservoirs along the weaver's distribution could reduce available habitat for the species.
