= Mwaru River =

River in Tanzania

Location
- Country: Tanzania
- Region: Singida Region

Physical characteristics
- Source
  - coordinates: 4°49′0″S 34°2′59″E
  - elevation: 1,218 m (3,996 ft)
- Mouth: Lake Kitangiri

The Mwaru River is a river in the Singida Region in Tanzania. The river is part of the Sibiti River basin which enters Lake Kitangiri.
