= Weru Weru River =

River in Kilimanjaro Region, Tanzania

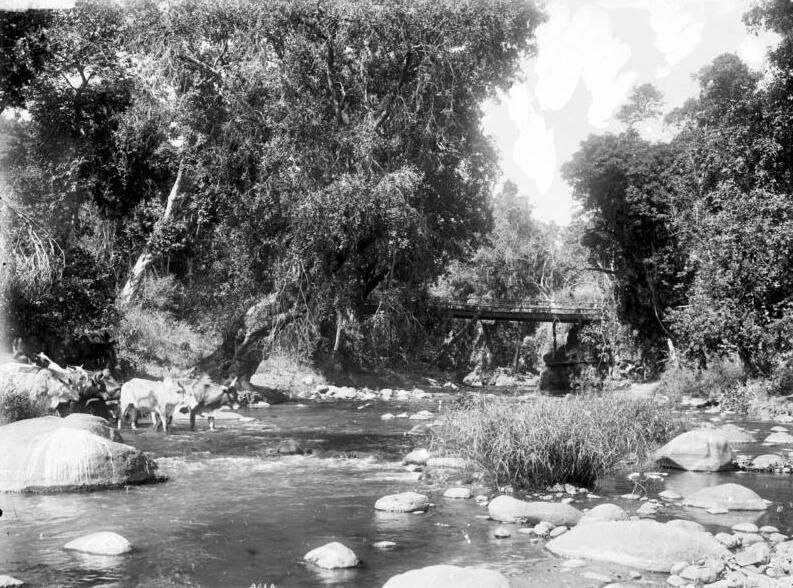
- Weru Weru River photo taken during the German colonial period c.1906
- Native name: Mto wa Weru Weru (Swahili)

Location
- Country: Tanzania
- Region: Kilimanjaro Region
- District: Moshi District
- Ward: Machame Mashariki

Physical characteristics
- Source
  - location: Machame Mashariki, Moshi District
  - coordinates: 03°23′59″S 37°17′59″E

Weru Weru River(Mto Weru Weru in Swahili) is found in northern Tanzania, in the Kilimanjaro Region. It rises in the Moshi District's Machame Mashariki ward and empties into the Pangani River. The Weru Weru River, like the Kikafu River, is significant to the history of the Chagga in the Machame kingdom.
