= Tarangire Ecosystem =

Coordinates: 3°50′0″S 36°00′0″E

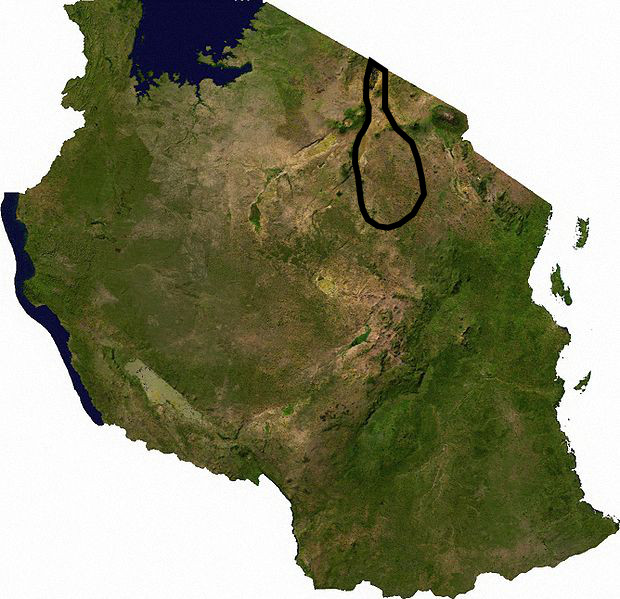
Approximate outline of the Tarangire Ecosystem in northern Tanzania.

The Tarangire Ecosystem (/ˌtɑːrɑːnˈɡɪreɪ/) is a geographical region in northern Tanzania, Africa. It extends between 2.5 and 5.5 degrees south latitudes and between 35.5 and 37 degrees east longitudes.

The Tarangire Ecosystem hosts the second-largest population of migratory ungulates in East Africa and the largest population of elephants in northern Tanzania.

The Tarangire Ecosystem is defined by watershed boundaries of the Lake Manyara Basin and the Engaruka Basin, and the long distance migratory movements of eastern white-bearded wildebeest and plains zebra. It includes the dry season wildlife concentration area near the Tarangire River in Tarangire National Park, and the wet-season dispersal and calving grounds to the north in the Northern Plains and to the east in Simanjiro Plains, spanning in total approximately 20,500 km^{2} (7,900 sq mi). Migratory animals must have access to both the dry-season water source in the park, and the nutrient-rich forage available only on the calving grounds outside the park to successfully raise their calves and maintain their high abundance.

The Tarangire Ecosystem is also known as the Masai Steppe, or the Tarangire-Manyara Ecosystem.

Tarangire has approximately 500 species of birds, and more than 60 species of larger mammal.

== Geography and climate ==
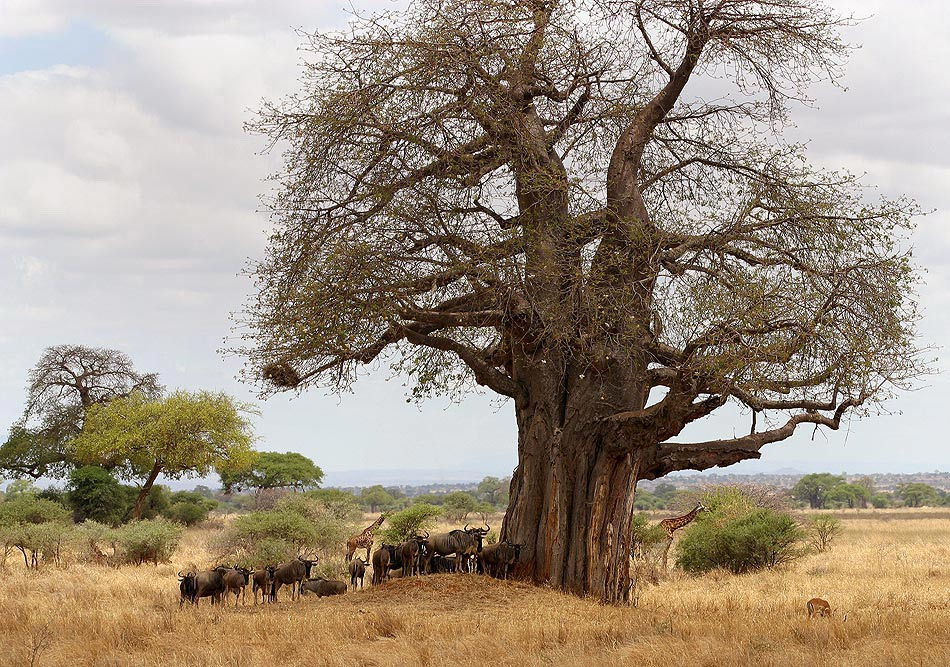
Baobab tree, wildebeests, giraffes, and impala in Tarangire National Park, 2011

The area falls within the eastern branch of the East African Rift Valley which has widened and the valley floor fallen over the past few million years. About 250,000 years ago Lake Manyara and Lake Burunge were part of a larger lake called Proto-Manyara, a basin of internal drainage that lost water through evaporation and deep percolation. Subsequent rises in the Rift Valley floor changed drainage patterns and the lake was reduced in size and divided into the two shallow, alkali lakes currently seen. Topography is now mainly low ridges of gneiss and pre-Cambrian rocks covered with well-drained, medium textured, stony soils. Large areas of valley bottoms are montmorillonite black cotton soils. Ancient lake sediments produced clay soils in the Proto-Manyara area. Minjingu Hill and Vilima Vitatu were islands in Proto-Manyara Lake and their phosphate deposits there are derived from accumulated waterbird feces. Volcanic ash deposits produce rich soils on the Northern Plains and Simanjiro Plains where migratory wildebeest and zebra find forage with the nutrients necessary for lactation and healthy calf growth.

The current western boundary is the rift valley escarpment, the northern boundary is the Kenyan border near Lake Natron, the southern and eastern boundaries are not defined by any strict geographic features. Elevation ranges from about 1000 m in the southwest to 2660 m in the northeast.

Tarangire has a bimodal rainfall averaging 650 mm per annum, with short rains from November to February, long rains from March to May, and dry season from June to October. The rains, particularly the short rains, are very unreliable and often fail. Rainfall varies inter-annually, the standard deviation of the annual rainfall is equal to 37% of the mean annual rainfall. The inter-annual variation of monthly rainfall varies even more markedly, the standard deviation of monthly rainfall is 72% of the mean. This high variability in rainfall is also reflected in a high inter-annual variation of the length of the wet season. For example, the wet season lasted 38 days in 1983/1984 and 200 days in 1987/1988.

The oldest known elephant to give birth to twins is found in Tarangire. A recent birth of elephant twins in the Tarangire National Park of Tanzania is a great example of how the birth of these two healthy and thriving twins can beat the odds.

== History ==
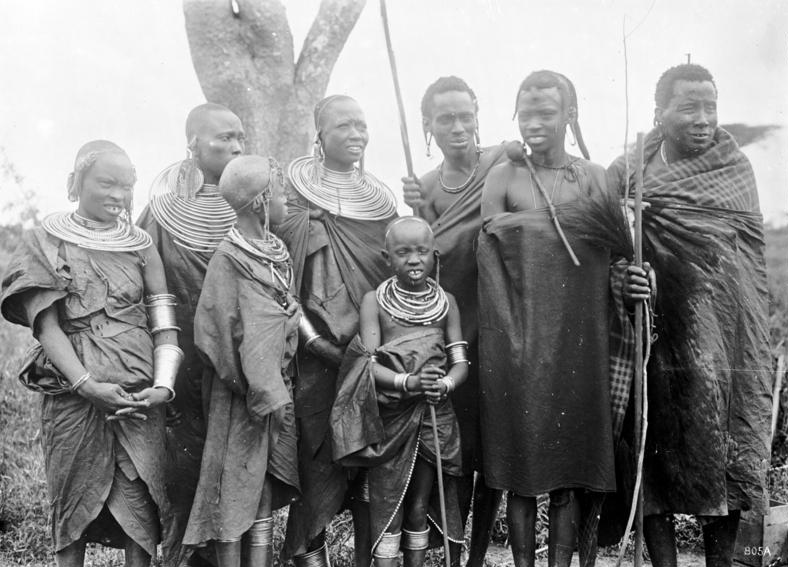
Group of Massai people c. 1910

Between the sixteenth and nineteenth centuries, the Maa-speaking pastoral people expanded into the area, replacing other pastoral groups like Nilotes and farming Bantu groups. By 1880 the Maasai reached their greatest extent. Around 1900 they suffered pleuro-pneumonia and smallpox diseases that killed many. At the same time the outbreak of the rinderpest decimated Maasai livestock and wildlife.

The colonial period of 1880s to 1950s saw the displacement of Maasai from lands with high potential for agricultural development by the European farmers/settlers. Many game parks were created at the same time, often evicting pastoralists from key dry season grazing areas and watering points. Because of the abundant water and pasture in the Tarangire ecosystem, it had a reputation as one of the best pastoral areas in Tanzania. Many herders who were evicted from the Serengeti National Park in the 1950s relocated to this area.

Tanzania became independent in 1961 and most of the British colonial administration/legislation was adopted by the new government. In the 1960s and 1970s the rinderpest that had previously killed many wildlife and livestock species was controlled. The control of rinderpest resulted in the increased numbers of wildebeest in the Serengeti ecosystem. This pushed Maasai into Tarangire area to avoid contact with wildebeest calving areas in the short grass-plains. Such areas are associated with the spread of Malignant Catarrhal Fever that affects cattle. Between 1962 and 1963 the worst drought in 50 years hit most parts of the country including Tarangire area and killed many wildlife and livestock.

In 1967 agriculture was promoted as the backbone of the national economy. Large-scale farms like the Lolkisale bean farms were established in Tarangire to produce crops for export as well as for national reserves during droughts and food shortage. Human population increased in Tarangire area due both to natural increase and immigration of agriculturists from nearby regions of Kilimanjaro and Arusha. This displaced Maasai pastoralists and wildlife from the best rangelands into more marginal areas.

In 1970, the Tarangire Game Reserve was upgraded to become Tarangire National Park. By the mid-1980s the movement of commercial interests and farmers into the area had expanded, blocking many traditional migratory routes for wildlife.

In 2001, the Tanzanian government turned over the National Ranching Company land at Manyrara Ranch to the Tanzania Land Conservation Trust to help conserve the wildlife migration corridor between Tarangire National Park and the calving grounds to the north on the Gelai Plains. Conservation easements are being used as conservation tools on the calving grounds east of Tarangire National Park on the Simanjiro Plains. Land-use planning informed by wildlife survey data is being tried to help conserve pastoral rangelands, wildlife migration routes, and calving grounds in the Northern Plains.
