= Mbulu Highlands =

Coordinates: 3.8556°S 35.5444°E

The Mbulu Highlands is a plateau in north-central Tanzania.

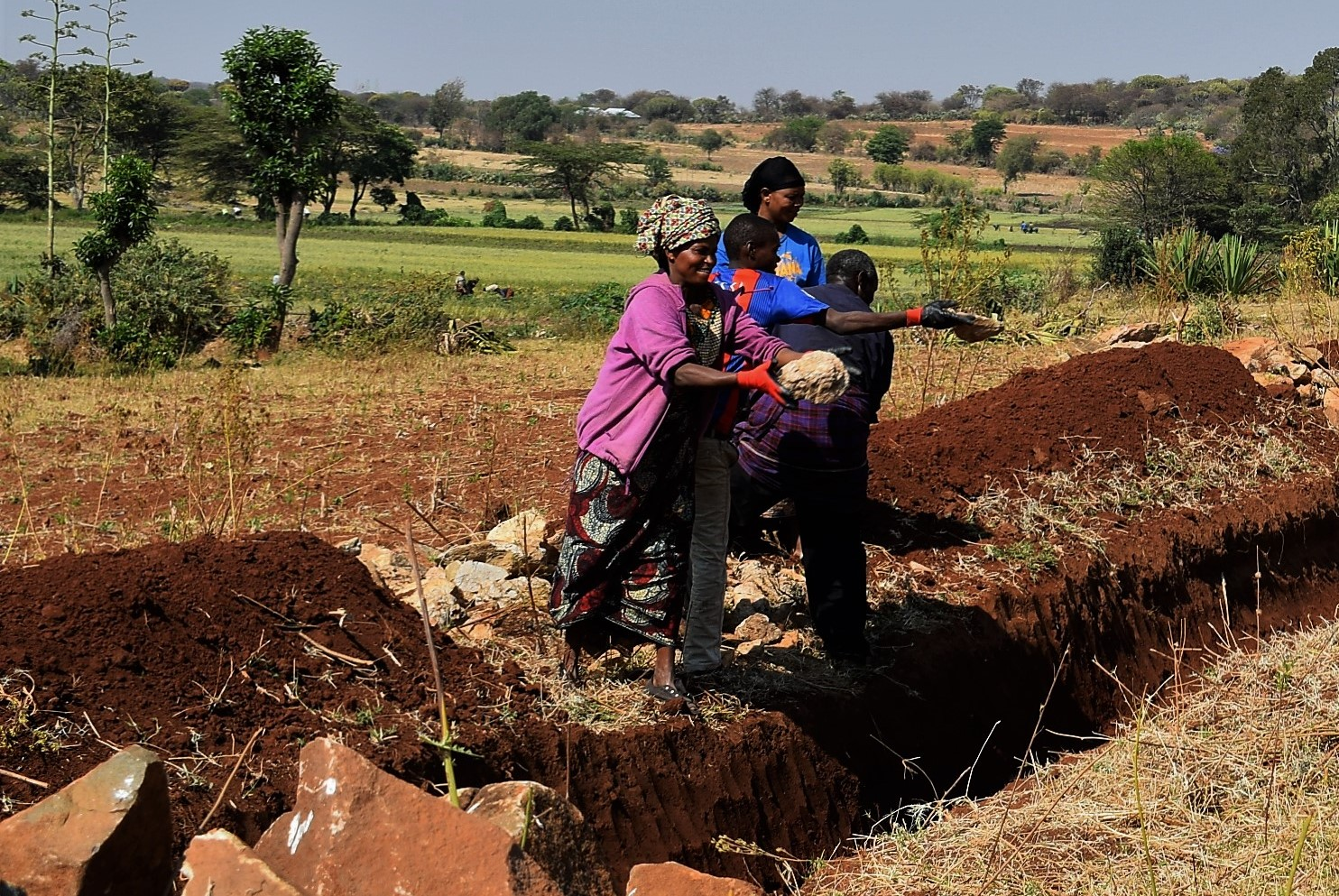
Women working on an irrigation canal, Dirim village, Mbulu District.

== Geography ==
The Mbulu Highlands lie between the basins of Lake Eyasi to the west and Lake Manyara to the east. The plateau ranges from 1500 to 2300 meters in elevation. The highlands extend northeast-southwest. A steep northeast-southwest-running escarpment bounds the highlands on the east, overlooking the basins of Lake Manyara, and further south, Lake Balangida. The plateau descends less steeply in a series of ridges and valleys to Lake Eyasi to the west and the Yaeda Valley to the southwest. To the north lies the volcanic Ngorongoro Highlands. The volcanic peak of Mount Hanang rises south of Lake Balangida.

The highlands lie mostly in Mbulu District of Manyara Region, extending northwards into Karatu District of Arusha Region. The principal town on the plateau is Mbulu.

Tanzania's B141 highway crosses the highlands, running through Mbulu on its way from Madukani east of the highlands to Singida in the southwest.

== Climate ==
Mean annual rainfall is 1000 mm or more in the highlands, higher than in the surrounding lowlands. Rainfall can vary greatly from year to year. June to September are the driest months, with little or no rainfall. Cool, foggy conditions often prevail, particularly in the mornings, which reduce evaporation and help sustain the plateau's farms and forests.

== People ==
The plateau is home to the Iraqw people, who practice intensive agriculture using a broad variety of crops and agricultural terraces. The cultivated areas are mostly above 1800 meters elevation.

== Ecology ==
The natural vegetation of the plateau is mostly miombo woodland. In the northern highlands, volcanic grasslands occur on soils formed from volcanic ash. Montane evergreen forests occur at higher elevations. The plateau has two forest reserves, Nou (305.19 km²) and Hassama (49.01 km²). Drier Acacia-Commiphora bushlands and thickets occupy the Eyasi and Manyara lowlands.
