= Tarangire National Park =

National park in Tanzania, East Africa

- Hifadhi ya Taifa ya Tarangire
- IUCN category II (national park)
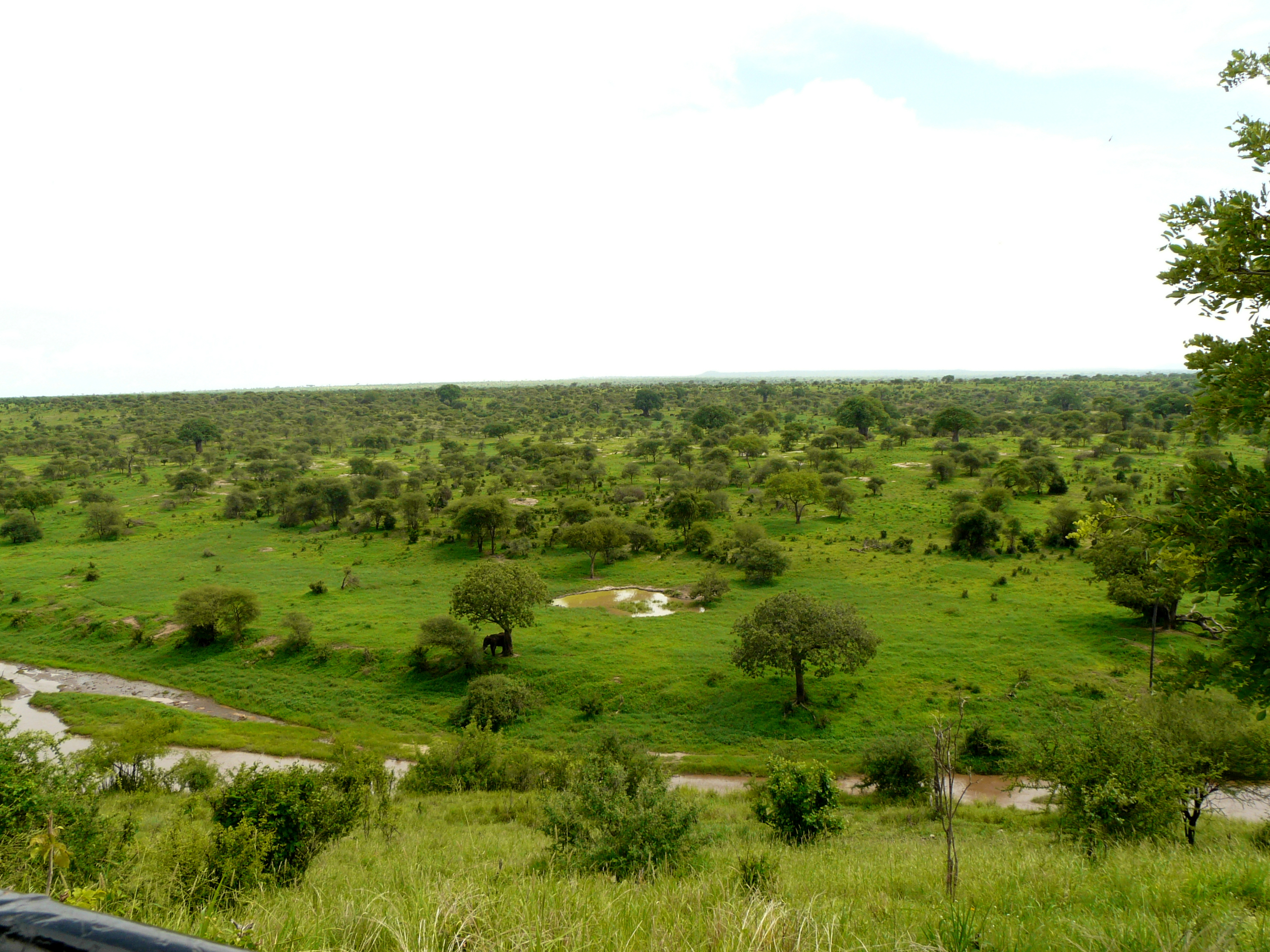

- Location within Tanzania
- Location: Tanzania
- Nearest city: Arusha
- Coordinates: 3°50′S 36°0′E
- Area: 2,850 km^{2} (1,100 sq mi)
- Established: 1970
- Visitors: 161,792 (in 2012)
- Governing body: Tanzania National Parks Authority
- Website: www.tanzaniaparks.go.tz

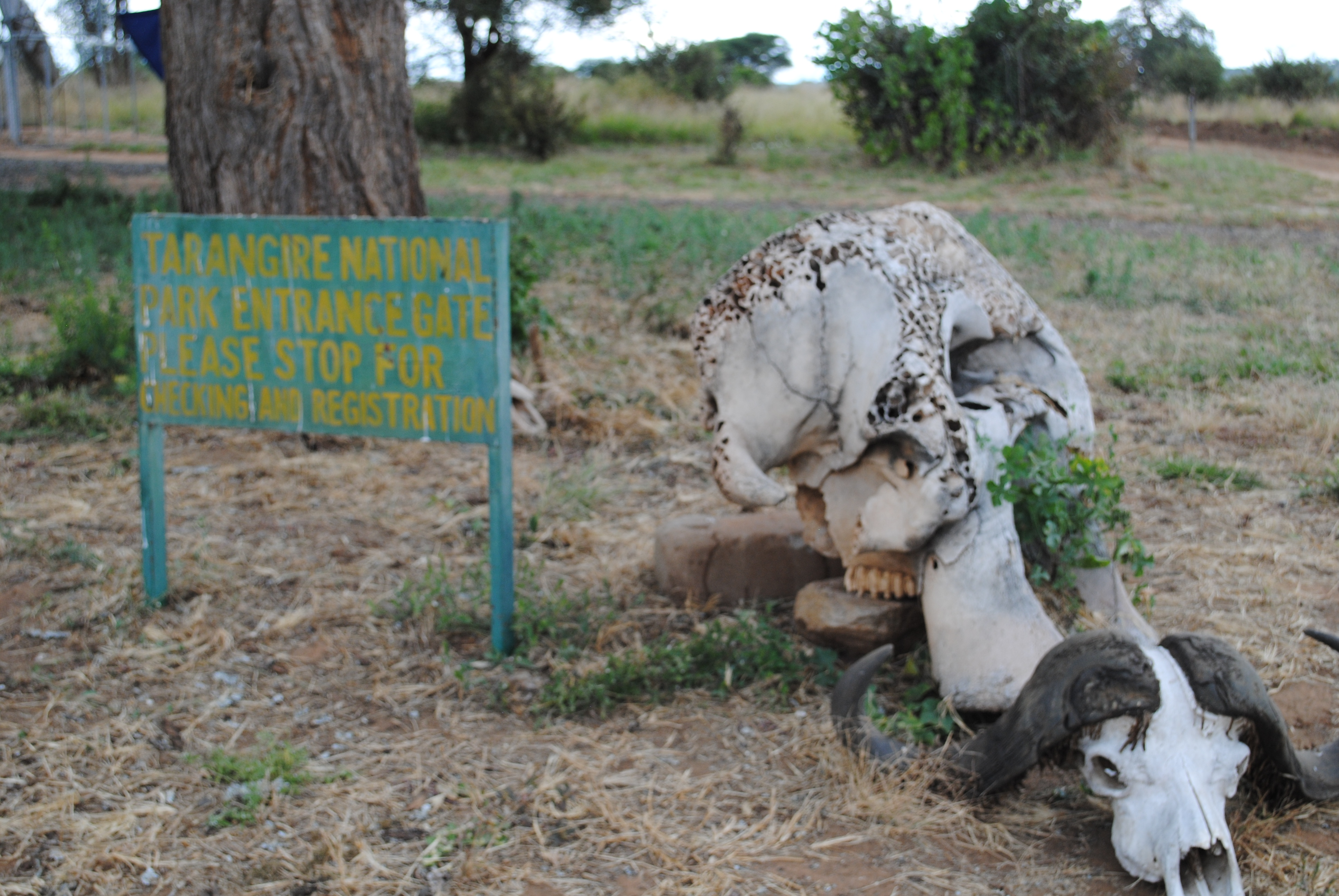
Entrance to Tarangire National Park

Tarangire National Park is a national park in Tanzania's Manyara Region. The name of the park originates from the Tarangire River that crosses the park. The Tarangire River is the primary source of fresh water for wild animals in the Tarangire Ecosystem during the annual dry season. The Tarangire Ecosystem is defined by the long-distance migration of wildebeest and zebras. During the dry season thousands of animals concentrate in Tarangire National Park from the surrounding wet-season dispersal and calving areas.

It covers an area of approximately 2,850 km^{2} (1,100 sq mi). The landscape is composed of granitic ridges, river valley, and swamps. Vegetation is a mix of Acacia woodland, Combretum woodland, seasonally flooded grassland, and Adansonia trees.

== Flora and fauna ==
The park is famous for its high density of elephants and baobab trees. Visitors to the park in the June to November dry season can expect to see large herds of thousands of zebra, wildebeest and cape buffalo. Other common resident animals include waterbuck, giraffe, dik dik, impala, eland, Grant's gazelle, vervet monkey, banded mongoose, and olive baboon. Predators in Tarangire include lion, leopard, cheetah, caracal, honey badger, and African wild dog.

The oldest known elephant to give birth to twins is found in Tarangire. A recent birth of elephant twins in the Tarangire National Park of Tanzania is a great example of how the birth of these two healthy and thriving twins can beat the odds.

Home to more than 550 bird species, the park is a haven for bird enthusiasts. The park is also famous for the termite mounds that dot the landscape. Those that have been abandoned are often home to dwarf mongoose. In 2015, a giraffe that is white due to leucism was spotted in the park. Wildlife research is focused on African bush elephant and Masai giraffe.

Since 2005, the protected area is considered a Lion Conservation Unit.

== Location and access ==
Tarangire National Park can be reached via paved road south from Arusha in under two hours. Lake Manyara National Park is a 70 kilometre (43 mile) drive from Tarangire.
