= Sanya River (Kilimanjaro) =

River in Kilimanjaro Region, Tanzania

- Native name: Mto Sanya (Swahili)

Location
- Country: Tanzania
- Region: Kilimanjaro Region
- District: Siha District
- Ward: Livishi

Physical characteristics
- Source
  - location: Livishi, Siha District
  - coordinates: 3°9′41.04″S 37°5′27.96″E

Basin features
- River system: Pangani River
- Tributaries
  - left: Fuka River
  - right: Lawate River

Sanya River (Mto Sanya in Swahili) is located in the northern Kilimanjaro Region of Tanzania. It begins in Livishi ward in Siha District and eventually drains into Kikuletwa River a tributary of the Pangani River. The river plays an important part of Chagga history in the Chagga kingdom of Siha (Kibongoto).
