= Kyejo =

Volcano in Tanzania

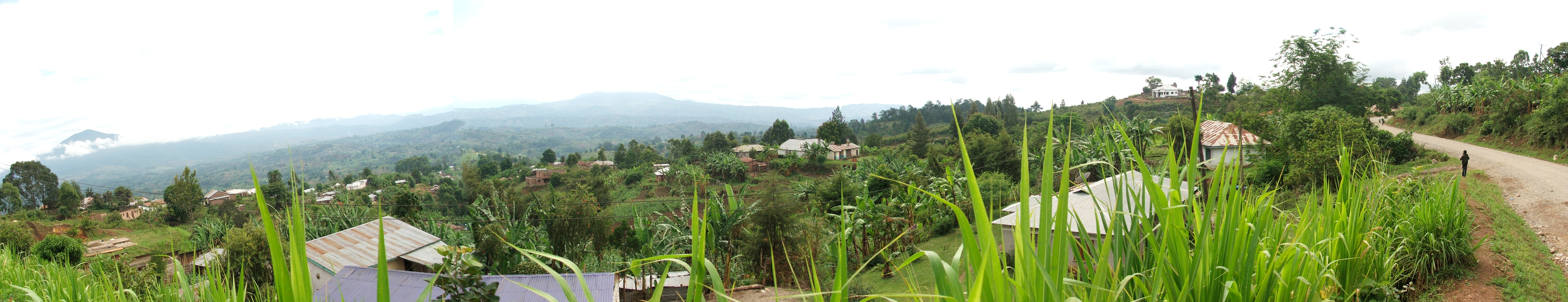
- View from Tukuyu

Highest point
- Elevation: 2,176 m (7,139 ft)
- Listing: List of volcanoes in Tanzania
- Coordinates: 9.229°N 33.792°E

Geography
- Country: Tanzania
- Region: Mbeya Region
- Parent range: Kipengere Range

Geology
- Formed by: Volcanism along the Albertine Rift
- Mountain type: Stratovolcano
- Last eruption: 1800

Kyejo is an active stratovolcano in the Rukwa Rift Basin of Tanzania. It is located northwest of Lake Malawi. Eruptions at Kyejo are typically effusive although some moderately-sized explosions occur at its summit. Its numerous parasitic cones, a combination of spatter and cinder cones, are mostly distributed along its southern flanks. Volcanic activity in the area initiated during the mid-Pleistocene. Its last eruption was dated to around 1800 and is the only historically documented eruption on Kyejo. This eruption occrred at the Sarabwe and Fiteko parasitic cones along a northwest trending fissure at its northwestern slope. The three-day eruption produced lava flows that travelled 8 km (5.0 mi).
