= Cheli River =

River in the Tabora Region, Tanzania

Location
- Country: Tanzania
- Region: Tabora Region

Physical characteristics
- Source
  - coordinates: 4°19′0″S 34°1′59″E

The Cheli River is a river in the Tabora Region in Tanzania. The river is part of the Sibiti River basin which enters Lake Kitangiri. The largest reservoir in the Internal Drainage Basin belongs to Mwamapuli Dam on Cheli river with a height of 10 m and capacity of 28 mcm.
