= Sibiti River =

River in Simiyu and Sindiga Regions, Tanzania

Coordinates: 3°49′S 34°46′E

The Sibiti River is a seventy-five-kilometre waterway which connects Lake Eyasi and Lake Kitangiri, forming a natural border between Singida Region and Simiyu Region in northcentral Tanzania.

The Sibiti River has one tributary, The Semu River. The Sibiti River belongs to a rather dense Basin which includes Lake Eyasi, and several rivers entering Lake Kitangiri, including:

- Manonga River
- Wembere River

- Cheli River
- Mpiringa River
- Mwaru River
- Mhawala River
- Nyahua River
- Chona River

- Kapatu River

== Sibiti River in History ==
- A Bantu-speaking people, The Nyiramba, crossed the Sibiti River while looking for pacific lands. Some of their anecdotes highlight the marshy nature of the area around the Sibiti River.
- Some archaeological remains have been found near lake Eyasi by a German Expedition in the 1930s.
