= Livishi =

Ward in Siha District, Kilimanjaro Region

Livishi Ward Kata ya livishi (Swahili)
- Ward
- Kata ya Livishi, Wilaya ya Siha
- Location within Tanzania
- Country: Tanzania
- Region: Kilimanjaro Region
- District: Siha District

Area
  - Total: 55.77 km^{2} (21.53 sq mi)
- Elevation: 2,109 m (6,919 ft)

Population (2012)
  - Total: 6,140
  - Density: 110/km^{2} (285/sq mi)

Livishi is an administrative ward in Siha District of Kilimanjaro Region in Tanzania. The ward covers an area of 55.77 km^{2} (21.53 sq mi), and has an average elevation of 2,109 m (6,919 ft). According to the 2012 census, the ward has a total population of 6,140.
