= Igwisi Hills =

Volcanic complex in Tabora Region of Tanzania

Highest point
- Elevation: 1,146 m (3,760 ft)
- Coordinates: 4°53′13.18″S 31°56′4.46″E

Geography
- Location: Tanzania

Geology
- Formed by: Volcanism along the Albertine Rift
- Rock age: 12.4 ka
- Mountain type: Pyroclastic cones
- Last eruption: 10450 BCE

The Igwisi Hills are a volcanic field in Kaliua District of Tabora Region of Tanzania. Three tuff cones are found there, one of which is associated with a lava flow. They are one of the few locations of possibly kimberlitic lava flows on Earth.

The volcanoes are located in the middle of the Tanzania craton, away from other Tanzanian volcanoes. There have been prior episodes of kimberlitic volcanism in the craton, however.

The age of the Igwisi Hills is poorly known but may be early Holocene-late Pleistocene in age. Some rainfall-induced chemical modification is found, and the hills have a unique vegetation profile.

== Geology ==
The Igwisi hills are formed by three tuff cones situated in the middle of the Tanzania craton. They are 70 metres (230 ft) above the landscape with a karst morphology and craters covered with grass, on a low ridge that may be the product of early eruptive stages. The northeastern hill has two craters, one with a breach from which a 500 metres (1,600 ft) long lava flow originates, probably formed when a lava lake in the crater escaped through a breach. The central volcano has a lava coulee and a tephra cone in its crater. Craters have diameters of 200–400 metres (660–1,310 ft). The total volume of these cones is less than 0.001 cubic kilometres (0.00024 cu mi). Weak pyroclastic activity probably accompanied the eruptive activity. Presumably, low intensity explosive activity built the cones, starting from the northeast cone and ending with the southwest cone. Afterwards, lava flows were generated.

The Igwisi Hills are the only places in the world where possible kimberlite lava flows have been found, in form of calcite-olivine lavas. Kimberlite tuffs are also found, a rare species which is very susceptible to erosion. True kimberlites are usually very old eruptive rocks, consequently any subsurface volcanic structure has long since been eroded away. These kimberlites were erupted in a fairly nonexplosive fashion. Not all researchers agree that these lavas are kimberlites, however, with the low alkali content being cited as a difference although the Benfontein "kimberlites" share this property with the Igwisi hills ones. If the Igwisi Hills aren't true kimberlites, the next youngest would be the 32.3 ± 2.2 Ma Kundelungu plateau pipes in the Democratic Republic of Congo.

These kimberlites are also the youngest kimberlites in the world by over thirty million years, cosmogenic helium-3 dates of olivine indicates they were erupted in the late Pleistocene-Holocene, some indicated ages being 11,200 ± 7,800 ± and 12,400 ± 4,800. A poorly constrained U-Pb date is 0 ± 29 million years. The cones display a young morphology. The basement terrain belongs to the 2,500 ± 100 million year old Dodoman sequence. The hills are remote from all other Tanzania volcanoes but tectonic stresses imposed on the craton by the East African Rift System may have played a role in their genesis. Prior kimberlite activity in the Tanzania craton is recorded 1,150, 189 and 53 million years ago.

The tuffs are highly calcitic, vesicular and contain numerous microxenoliths. The petrologically similar lavas show evidence of a differentiation by flow and gravity and have trachytic textures. Lavas have a carbonatitic composition. Olivines with diopside cores are found at the Igwisi Hills. Garnet and orthopyroxene is associated with the diopside. Olivines are surrounded by chromite. Olivines characterize the texture of the Igwisi rocks, where they form spherical inclusions. The olivines are primarily forsteritic in composition. Inclusions in the kimberlite include skeletal apatite, stellate aragonite and calcite, and are typical for cratonic kimberlites. High concentrations of CO_{2} are found in the rock, which may have resulted in the depolymerization of the melt, increasing its fluidity and resulting in effusive activity. Peridotite xenoliths originate from 180 kilometres (110 mi) of depth. Spinels in the groundmass suggest that crustal contamination was extensive, with dunite nodules originating from the middle lithosphere, but isotope data instead indicate a low contamination. The geochemistry suggests an origin at high pressures (depths of 150–200 kilometres (93–124 mi)) and equilibrium temperatures of 1,000 °C (1,830 °F). Rainfall has subsequently modified the pyroclastics and formed secondary calcite, while the less permeable lava flows were less modified.

The hills have a unique vegetation, with aquatic plants found in the middle of the craters and distinct vegetation on inner crater slopes from the extra-crateric territory. The hills have a rare occurrence of Asclepias pseudoamabilis.
