= Umba Valley =

Geographic feature in Tanga Region, Tanzania

Coordinates: 4.6806°N 39.2133°E

Umba Valley (Bonde la Umba, in Swahili) is a geographic area in Tanzania and the world's only source of Umba sapphires.

The Umba River flows through the Umba Valley.

Specifically, Umba Valley is located in the north of the Usambara Mountains in the Tanga Region of Tanzania Between Mkinga and Lushoto Districts.

== See also ==
- Geography of Tanzania
