= Umba River (Tanzania) =

River in Mkinga District, Tanga Region of Tanzania and Kwale County, Kenya

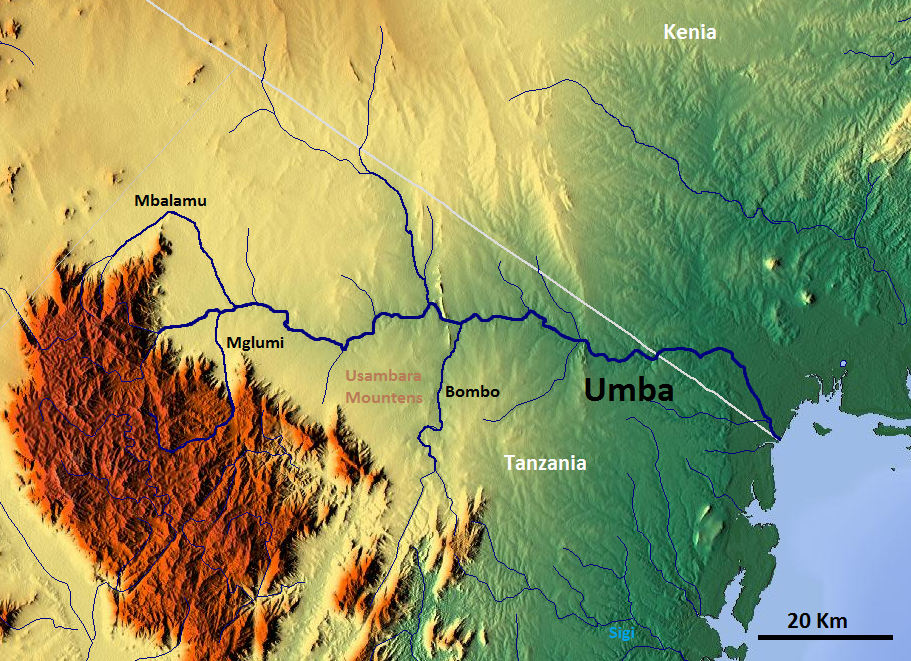

Location
- Country: Tanzania
- County: Tanga Region
- District: Mkinga
- Country: Kenya
- Region: Kwale County

Physical characteristics
- Source
  - location: Usambara Mountains, Lushoto, Tanga Region of Tanzania
  - elevation: 2,000 m (6,600 ft)
- Mouth
  - location: at Mayomboni in the Pemba Channel, Tanzania
  - coordinates: 4°40′50″S 39°12′48″E
  - elevation: 0 m (0 ft)
- Basin size: 7,130 km^{2} (2,750 sq mi)

Basin features
- Tributaries
  - left: Mglumi; Bombo
  - right: Mbalamu

The Umba River (Swahili: Mto Umba) is located in northeastern Tanzania in Lushoto and Mkinga Districts of Tanga Region. It rises in Schageiuforest (Shagayu) in the West Usambara Mountains of Lushoto at 2,000 m altitude and flows on the north side of the mountain range to the east. At Lelwa it empties the Mbalamu River, which comes from the extreme north of the Usambara Mountains, and the Mglumi River into the Umba. Just before the Umba flows into the Indian Ocean, it crosses the border to Kenya. The mouth itself marks the most eastern point on the border between Tanzania and Kenya, which was largely made in a straight line to the northwest towards Lake Victoria in the 19th century. On the upper reaches of the river in the mid-1960s rich deposits of precious stones, including sapphires and spessartine, were discovered. Also on the river is the Umba River Game Reserve, a wildlife reserve that includes along with the Mkomazi Game Reserve, about 2,600 km^{2}.

== Hydrometry ==
The flow of the river has been observed over 40 years (1963–2003) in Mbuta, a town about 40 km above the mouth.

The average monthly flow of the river Umba hydrological station of Mbuta (in m^{3} / s ) (calculated using the data for a period of 30 years, 1954–84)

== See also ==
- Geography of Tanzania
- Umba Valley
- Umba sapphires
