= Kisangara River =

River in Kilimanjaro Region

- Native name: Mto Kisangara (Swahili)

Location
- Country: Tanzania
- Region: Kilimanjaro Region
- District: Mwanga District

Physical characteristics
- Source
  - location: North Pare Mountains
- Mouth
  - location: Nyumba ya Mungu Reservoir
  - coordinates: 3°35′00″S 37°31′00″E

Basin features
- River system: Pangani River

Kisangara River (Swahili: Mto Kisangara) is located in the central Kilimanjaro Region, Tanzania. It begins in North Pare Mountains in Mwanga District and drains in the Nyumba ya Mungu Reservoir on the border with Simanjiro District in Manyara Region.
