= Ngerengere River =

River in Morogoro Region, Tanzania

Coordinates: 7°03′S 38°31′E

Location
- Country: Tanzania
- Region: Morogoro Region

Physical characteristics
- Source: Uluguru Mountains
  - location: Morogoro Region
- Mouth: Ruvu River

Ngerengere River is a river of the Morogoro Region of Tanzania. It rises in the Uluguru Mountains, and flows eastwards to join the Ruvu River at approximately 7.05085 S, 38.51571 E. The city of Morogoro is on the Ngerengere River.

The Mindu Dam project, began in 1978, has been surrounded by controversy. The dam is being rapidly silted due to deforestation in the surrounding areas. It faces mercury poisoning from gold mining nearby and a threat to water supply.

In 2023, a colony of Ruvu Weavers, a threatened bird species, was found along the wetlands of the river.
