= Yaeda Valley =

Valley in Manyara Region, Tanzania

Coordinates: 4°0′1.11″S 34°59′59.7″E

The Yaeda Valley, or Yaida Valley, is a swampy valley located in Mbulu District of Manyara Region, Tanzania. The Valley is situated south of Lake Eyasi.

The valley forms an endorheic basin with no drainage outlet. A low ridge running northeast–southwest separates the valley from the basin of Lake Eyasi.

The Yaeda Swamp is fed from the northeast by the Yaeda River, which originates in the Mbulu Highlands to the east. On the valley floor are 162 km^{2} (63 sq mi) of seasonal swamp with extensive areas of rush and sedge, and 80 km^{2} (31 sq mi) of floodplain grassland with Vachellia drepanolobium thicket at the northern end of the valley that are inundated during periods of exceptionally high rainfall. Above the floodplain are approximately 121 km^{2} (47 sq mi) of wooded hillsides, with Vachellia tortilis near the edge of the floodplain, Vachellia kirkii woodland near the V. drepanolobium thickets at the north end of the floodplain, and surrounded by baobab woodland on higher slopes.

The swamp is home to numerous waterbirds, including Cattle egrets (Bubulcus ibis), Glossy ibises (Plegadis falcinellus), Black-necked grebes (Podiceps nigricollis), Black-tailed godwits (Limosa limosa), Ruffs (Calidris pugnax), Fulvous tree ducks (Dendrocygna bicolor), and Knob-billed ducks (Sarkidiornis melanotos). Elephants (Loxodonta africana) and leopards (Panthera pardus) inhabit the grasslands, woodlands, and thickets.

The surrounding country is Acacia-Commiphora bushland and thicket, and home to the Hadza people. The Hadza traditionally forage for wild food, including hunting, seed collecting, and gathering honey. Increasing numbers of pastoralists have moved into the valley, grazing their herds of cattle on the floodplain grasslands and in the swamps during the dry season.
