= Kikafu River =

River in Kilimanjaro Region, Tanzania

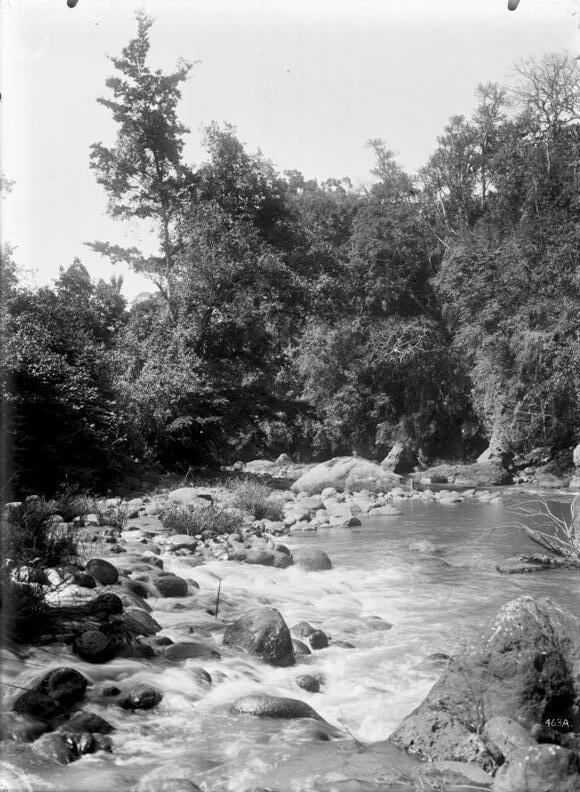
- Kikafu River photo taken during the German colonial period c.1906
- Native name: Mto Kikafu (Swahili)

Location
- Country: Tanzania
- Region: Kilimanjaro Region
- District: Moshi District
- Ward: Machame Mashariki

Physical characteristics
- Source
  - location: Machame Mashariki, Moshi District
  - coordinates: 03°26′8.16″S 37°18′16.02″E

Basin features
- River system: Pangani River
- Tributaries
  - left: Marire River
  - right: Makoo River

Kikafu River (Swahili: Mto Kikafu) is located in the northern Kilimanjaro Region, Tanzania. It begins in Machame Mashariki ward in Moshi District and drains into the Pangani River. The river plays an important part of Chagga history in the Chagga kingdom of Machame.
