= Umba sapphire =

Gemstone from Tanga Region, Tanzania

The Umba sapphire is a unique type of sapphire discovered in 1962 in the Gerevi Hills, north of the Umba River in the Umba Valley of Mkinga District of Tanga Region in Tanzania. Umba sapphires exhibit coloration not common to sapphires found in other parts of the world, and are recovered from the alluvial deposits of the Umba River.

As of November 2006, the Tanzanian government prohibits export of these sapphires.
