= Tarangire River =

River in Manyara Region, Tanzania

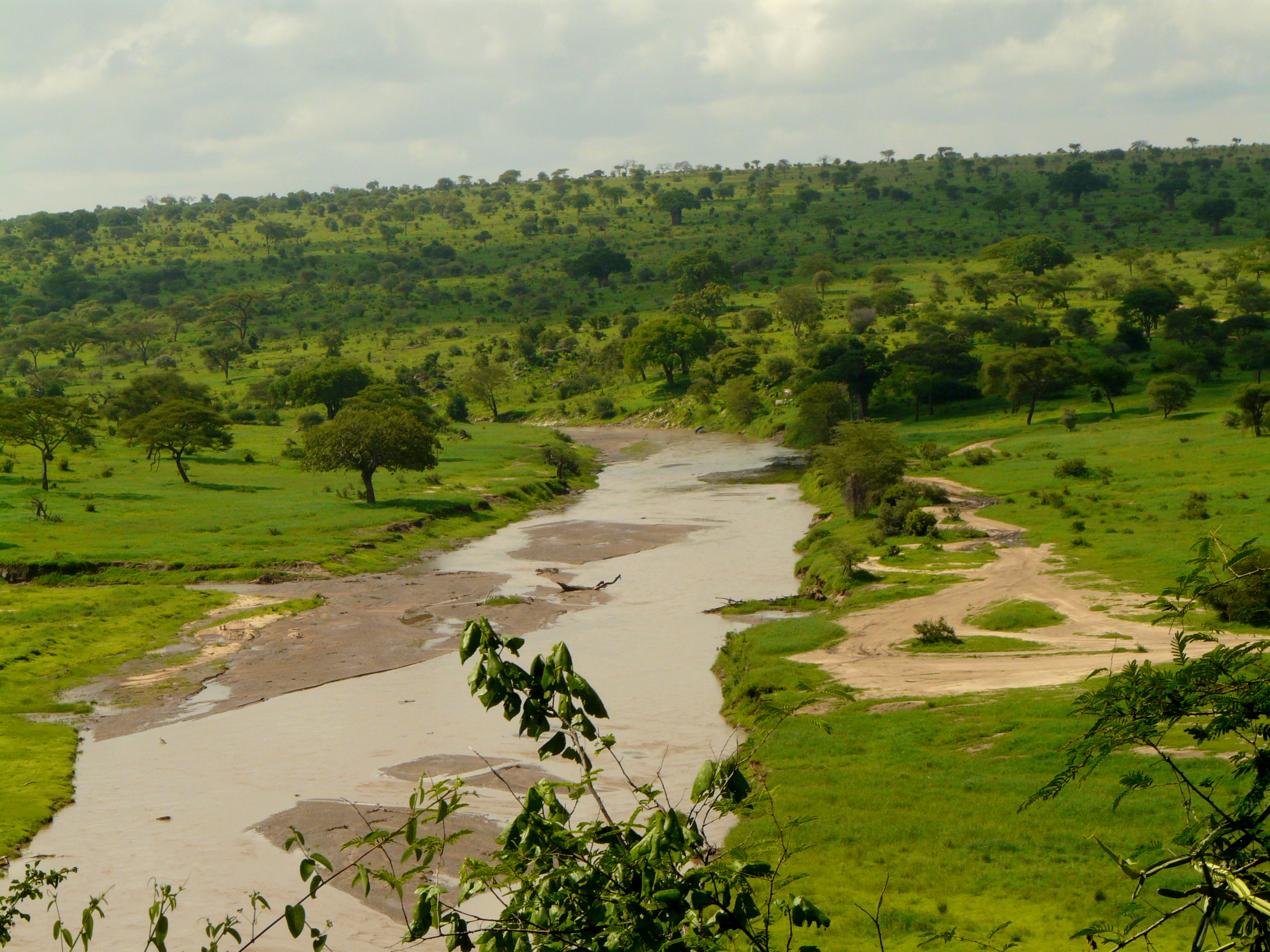
- Tarangire river in Tarangire National Park, Tanzania.

Location
- Country: Tanzania
- Region: Manyara Region
- Region: Dodoma Region

Physical characteristics
- Source: Babati District
  - location: Manyara Region, Tanzania
- 2nd source: Irangi Hills, Kondoa District
  - location: Dodoma Region, Tanzania
- 3rd source: Irangi Escarpment, Kondoa District
  - location: Dodoma Region, Tanzania
- Mouth: Lake Burunge

3°48′43″S 35°53′20″E — River mouth

The Tarangire River is a perennial river located in central Manyara Region in the eastern branch of the East African Rift Valley, within northern Tanzania.

== Course ==
The headwaters of the Tarangire River are in the highlands and escarpments of Babati District of the Manyara Region and Kondoa District of the Dodoma Region, primarily the Irangi Hills and Irangi Escarpment in Kondoa District. The river rises in the Wasi Highlands, falls down the eastern Kondoa Escarpment. It flows east to Chubi where it then turns north to flow through Tarangire National Park.

It then turns west and then south, before terminating at its river mouth on Lake Burunge.

== Ecology ==
Much of the Tarangire River headwaters in the Irangi Hills headwaters area is forested with Miombo woodland habitat trees and lower plants, that are designated for protection within the Salanka, Bereko, and Isabe Forest Reserves. Deforestation for agriculture and degradation of forests in the Irangi Hills and along the Irangi Escarpment is contributing to reductions in the Tarangire River's watershed function and aquifer recharge.

The discharge in the Tarangire River is highly seasonal and varies annually. In the wet season, rainfall in the Irangi Hills and throughout the catchment causes a high rate of flow with rapid rises and falls in water level. Rainfall occurs almost exclusively in November–January and March–May. It is highly variable, with a mean total annual rainfall of 656 millimetres (25.8 in) (coefficient of variation = 36.4%, range 313–1,322). River flow in the dry season is slow (about 0.005 cubic meters per second) and steadily decreasing as water is released from sediments, until long stretches of the riverbed are dry.

The Tarangire River is the primary source of fresh water for migratory ungulates and other wildlife of the Tarangire Ecosystem during the annual dry season.

== See also ==
- Lake Manyara — prehistoric lake in area.
- Tarangire Ecosystem — also known as the Masai Steppe + Tarangire-Manyara Ecosystem.
