= Machame Mashariki =

Ward in Hai District, Kilimanjaro Region

Machame Mashariki Ward Kata ya Machame Mashariki (Swahili)
- Ward
- Kata ya Machame Mashariki, Wilaya ya Hai
- Location within Tanzania
- Country: Tanzania
- Region: Kilimanjaro Region
- District: Hai District

Area
  - Total: 85.1 km^{2} (32.9 sq mi)
- Elevation: 2,315 m (7,595 ft)

Population (2012)
  - Total: 13,084
  - Density: 154/km^{2} (398/sq mi)

Machame Mashariki is an administrative ward in Hai District of Kilimanjaro Region in Tanzania. The ward covers an area of 85.1 km^{2} (32.9 sq mi), and has an average elevation of 2,315 m (7,595 ft). According to the 2012 census, the ward has a total population of 13,084.
