= Manonga River =

River in Tabora and Shinyanga Region, Tanzania

Coordinates: 4°08′S 34°12′E

- Relief location map of Tanzania

Location
- Country: Tanzania
- Region: Tabora
- Region: Singida
- Region: Shinyanga

Physical characteristics
- Source
  - elevation: 1,039 m (3,409 ft) above sea level
- Mouth
  - location: Lake Kitangiri

Manonga River, also known as Manyonga, is a river in located between Tabora Region and Shinyanga Region, Tanzania. The river flows eastwards into Lake Kitangiri. During the dry season, from June to November, the Manonga River is completely dry.
