= Wembere River =

River in Singida Region, Tanzania

Coordinates: 4°10′S 34°11′E

- Native name: Mto Wembere (Nyaturu)

Location
- Country: Tanzania
- Region: Singida Region

Physical characteristics
- Source: Nyahua River
  - location: Tanzania
- 2nd source: Wamba River
  - location: Tanzania
- 3rd source: Mapiringa River
  - location: Tanzania
- Mouth: Lake Kitangiri

The Wembere River is a river located in north western Singida Region, Tanzania. It originates from hilly terrain in central Tanzania, emptying into Lake Kitangiri. The river is part of the basin of Lake Eyasi. It supports an ecosystem of flooded grasslands in its floodplain.

== Description ==
The Wembere River originates in hilly country in central Tanzania at 6.0º south, and flows northwards through a branch of the Eastern Rift Valley. Its tributary, the Nyahua River, forms a seasonal floodplain 60 kilometres (37 mi) long and 1–5 kilometres (0.62–3.11 mi) wide, covering 11,000 ha (42 mi^{2}). After the Nyahua joins the Wembere from the northwest, the Wembere traverses a larger floodplain 105 km (65 mi) long and up to 20 km (12 mi) wide, and covering 140,000 ha (540 mi^{2}). Other tributaries are the Wamba, which joins from the northeast, the Mwaru, which joins from the east, and the Mapiringa, which joins from the west. The floodplain consists of flooded grasslands, inundated during the wet season and laced with drainage channels. Stands of red acacia and whistling thorn trees edge the seasonally-flooded portion of the plain. Above the floodplain, the eastern side of the watershed is chiefly miombo woodland, and the western side, called the Wembere Steppe, is Acacia-Commiphora savanna.

Below the floodplain the river turns northeast and empties into the south end of Lake Kitangiri. Lake Kitangiri empties into Lake Eyasi via the Sibiti River.
