= Lake Sulunga =

Lake in Dodoma and Singida Regions, Tanzania

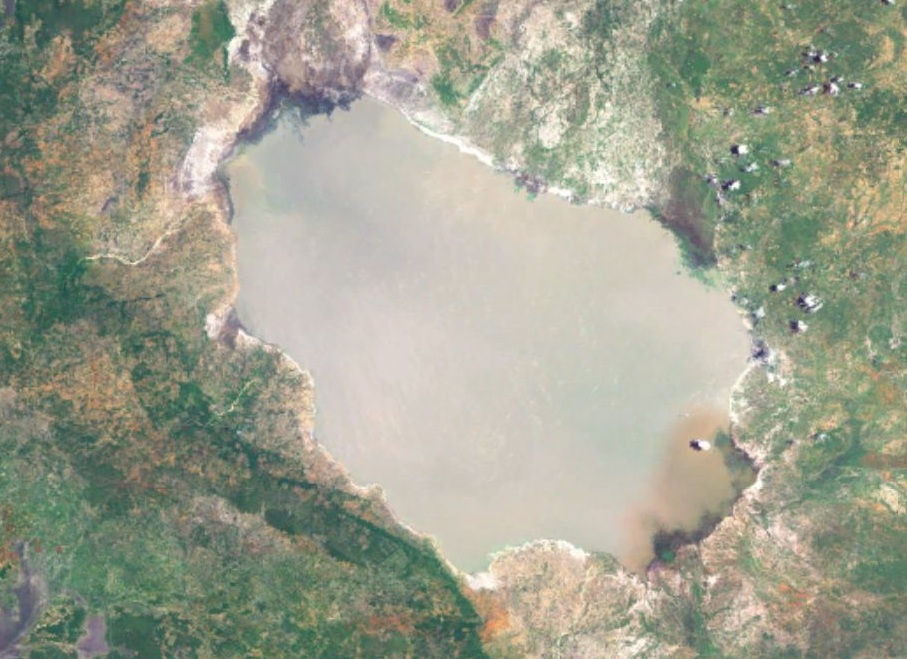

- Location within Tanzania
- Location: Dodoma Region and Singida Region, Tanzania
- Coordinates: 6°5′S 35°11′E
- Primary inflows: Bubu
- Primary outflows: endorheic
- Catchment area: 23,447 km^{2} (9,053 sq mi)
- Max. length: 42 km (26 mi)
- Max. width: 26 km (16 mi)
- Surface area: 974 km^{2} (376 sq mi)
- Settlements: Chala

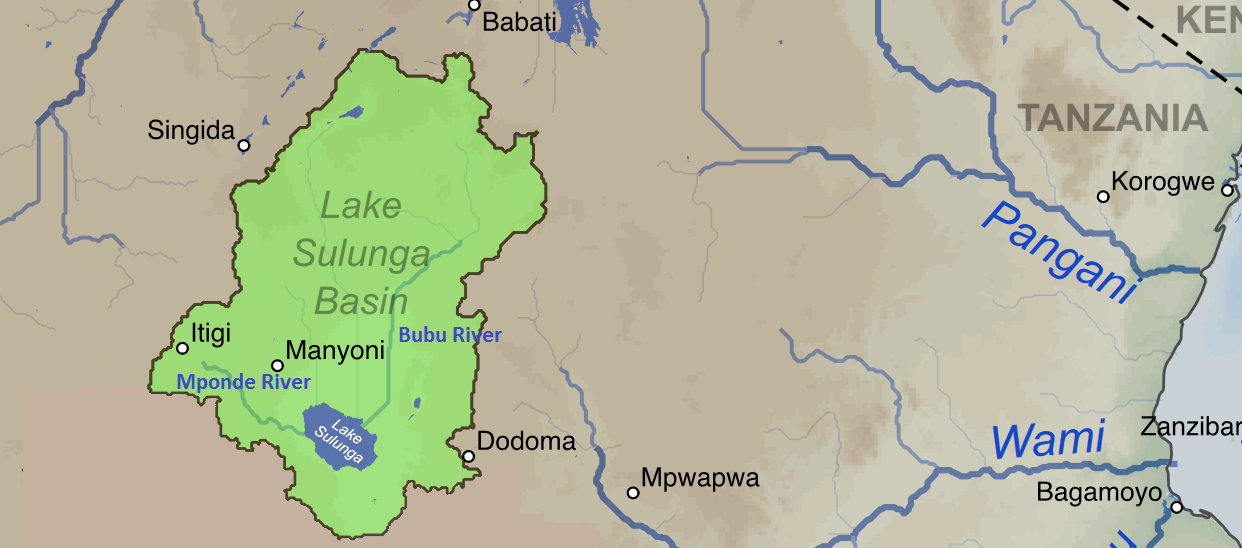
Drainage basin of Lake Sulunga (green)

Lake Sulunga, also known as Bahi Swamp, is a shallow seasonal lake on the border of the Dodoma and Singida regions in Tanzania. It is the largest body of water for both regions during the wet season.

It is located about 45 km west of the capital Dodoma in an endorheic basin known as the Bahi depression. It lies at an altitude of 830 metres (2,720 ft) and has a maximum extent of 974 square kilometres (376 sq mi). The catchment area is 23,447 square kilometres (9,053 sq mi). The lake is about 42 kilometres (26 mi) long and 26 kilometres (16 mi) wide, but can completely disappear in dry years. Its main tributaries are the Bubu and the Mponde.

The lake is surrounded by a variety of settlements and plays an important role in local fishing and animal husbandry.

The lake is in danger of being severely affected by mining in the future, as the area is evidently home to uranium, gold and probably diamonds.
