= Lake Balangida =

Alkaline Lake in Manyara Region, Tanzania

- Location within Tanzania
- Coordinates: 4°20′S 35°20′E
- Type: alkaline, saline
- Primary outflows: none
- Basin countries: Tanzania
- Max. length: 15.5 km (9.6 mi)
- Max. width: 3 km (1.9 mi)
- Surface area: 33 km^{2} (13 sq mi)
- Surface elevation: 1,947 m (6,388 ft)
- Islands: none

Lake Balangida is a shallow alkaline lake in Hanang District of west Manyara Region in the Natron-Manyara-Balangida branch of the East African Rift in north-central Tanzania.

The area surrounding Lake Balangida is used for agriculture and grazing.
