= Ruvu River =

Coordinates: 6°22′47″S 38°51′39″E

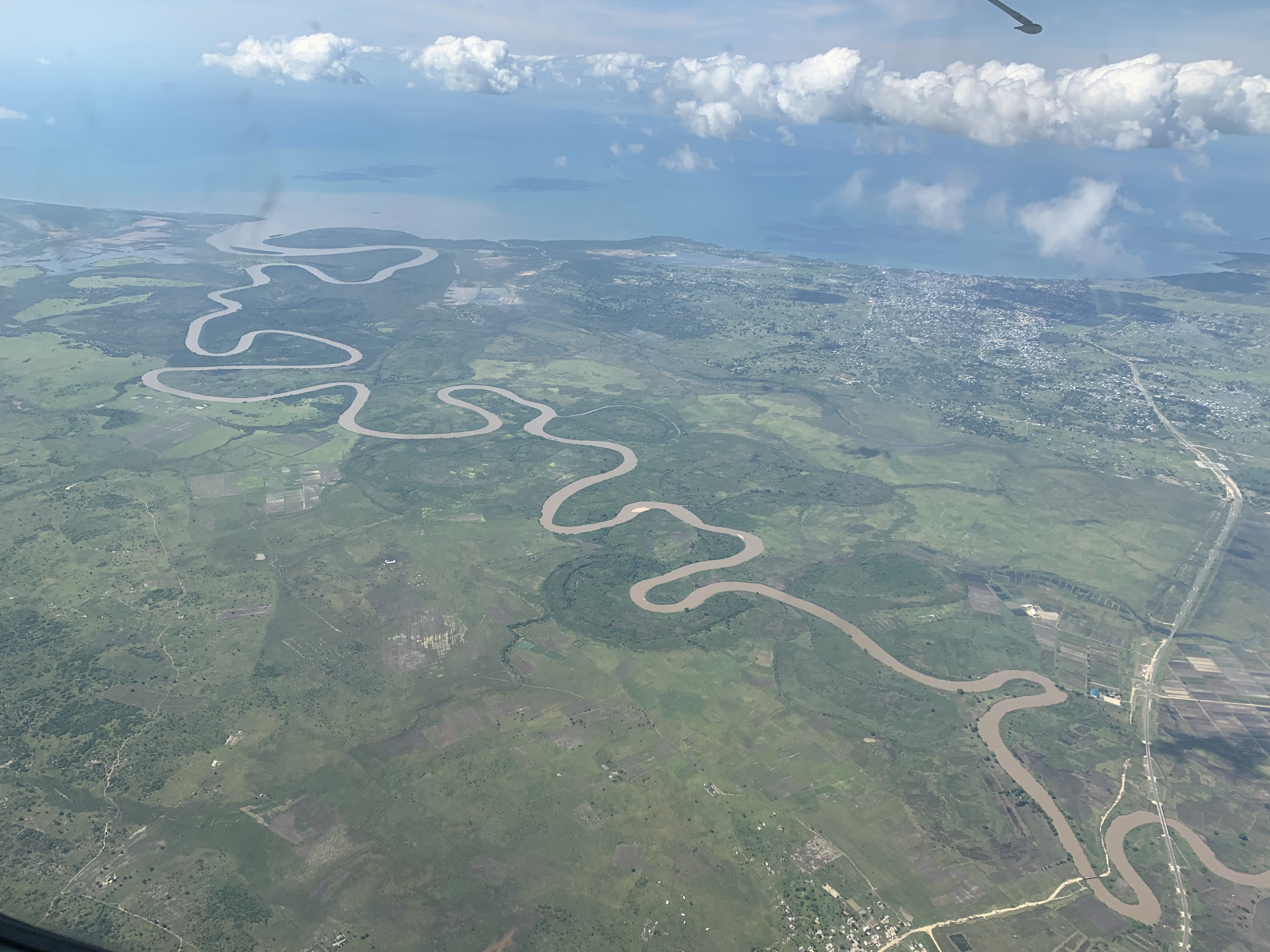
- Lower course and mouth of the Ruvu River, with the city of Bagamoyo to the right.

Location
- Country: Tanzania

Physical characteristics
- Source: Ngerengere River, Uluguru Mountains
  - location: Tanzania
- Mouth
  - location: Indian Ocean
- Basin size: 11,789 square kilometres (4,552 sq mi)

The Ruvu River is a river in eastern Tanzania.

The Ruvu River originates in the southern Uluguru Mountains and flows eastwards to empty into the Indian Ocean near Bagamoyo. Its chief tributary is the Ngerengere River, which rises in the northern Ulugurus and flows through the city of Morogoro before joining the Ruvu. The Ruvu drains a catchment of 11,789 km², which includes portions of Morogoro and Pwani regions. The Wami River catchment lies to the north and west, and the Rufiji River catchment lies to the south.

The Ruvu River is an important source of water for households, irrigated farms, and industries in communities along the river. It is also the principal source of water for Dar es Salaam, Tanzania's largest city, which lies on the coast east of the Ruvu catchment. It suffers increasing levels of pollution from the release of untreated households and industrial wastewater into the river.
