= Lake Kitangiri =

Lake in Sinigida Region, Tanzania

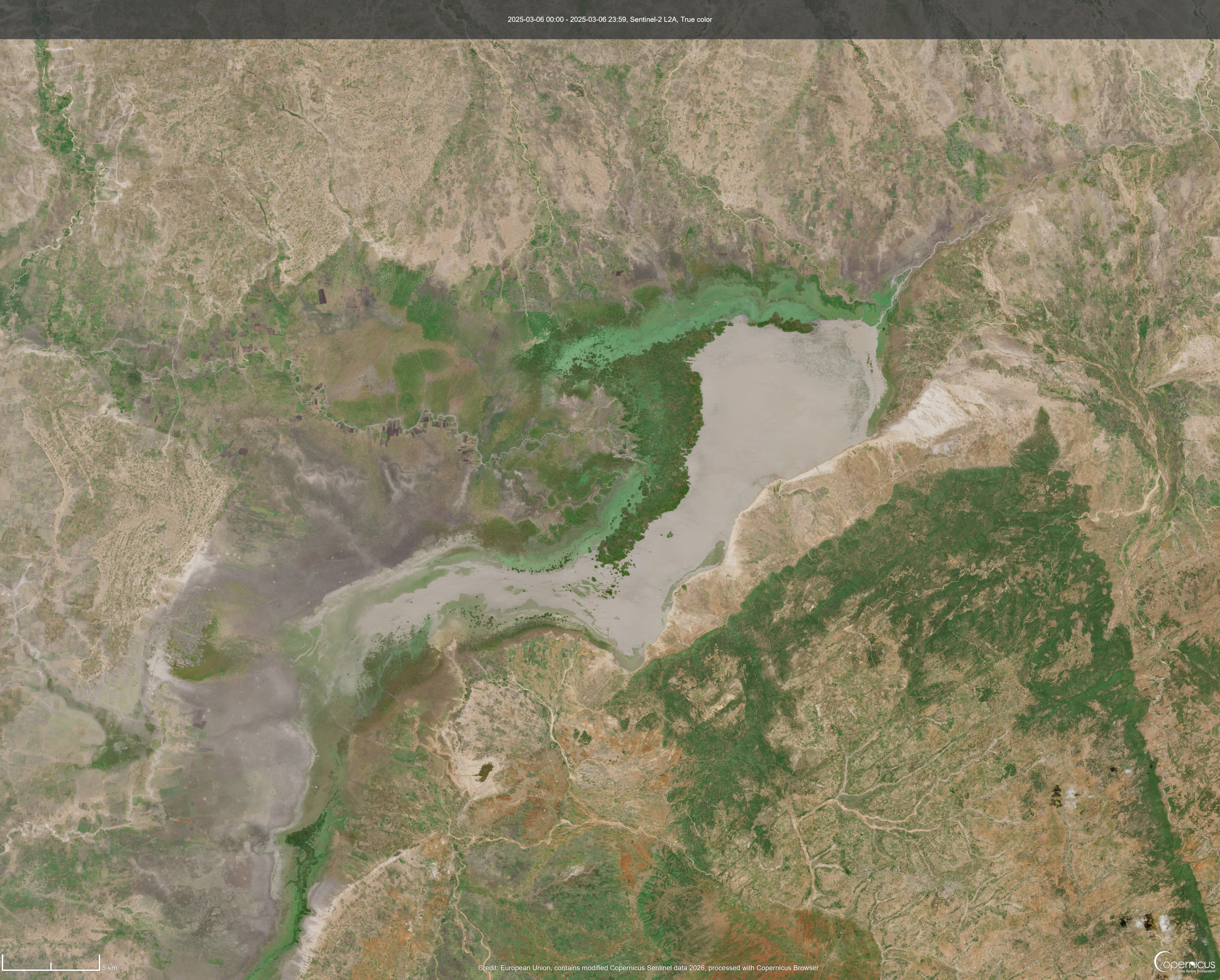
- Lake Kitangiri on 6 March 2025

- Location within Tanzania
- Location: Singida Region and Simiyu Region, Tanzania
- Coordinates: 4.10°S 34.28°E
- Type: Rift Valley lake
- Primary inflows: Wembere River, Manonga River
- Primary outflows: Sibiti River
- Basin countries: Tanzania
- Max. length: 30 km (19 mi)
- Max. width: 8 km (5.0 mi)
- Surface area: 11,500 ha (28,000 acres)
- Average depth: 3–5 m (9.8–16.4 ft)

Lake Kitangiri is a small freshwater lake in the Singida and Simiyu Regions of Tanzania. It is 30 kilometres (19 mi) long and 8 kilometres (5.0 mi) at its widest, covering an area of 11,500 ha (44 mi^{2}).

== Description ==
Lake Kitangiri is a freshwater lake that spans 30 kilometres (19 mi) in length and is 8 kilometres (5.0 mi) at its widest, covering an area of 11,500 ha (44 mi^{2}). Its depth averages 3–5 metres (9.8–16.4 ft), which fluctuates by 1–3 metres (3.3–9.8 ft) throughout the year. It occasionally floods the flat plains to its north and west. The seasonal Wembere and Manonga Rivers drain into Lake Kitangiri during the rainy season. Its outflow is the Sibiti River at its northern end, which seasonally drains into the southern end of Lake Eyasi.

Lake Kitangiri was once part of a larger paleo-Lake Eyasi. The paleolake may have been created when water from paleo-Lake Victoria flowed into the Eyasi–Wembere basin, and as its water level dropped it split into the modern Lakes Kitangiri and Eyasi.
