= Lake Eyasi =

Lake in Arusha Region, Tanzania

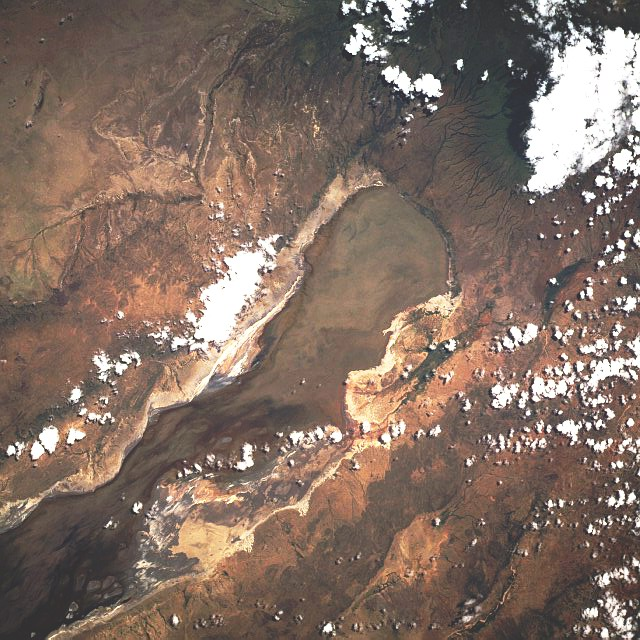
- Lake Eyasi from space, May 1993, nearly devoid of water. North is to the top. The indented southeast shore is filled in by sediment.

- Location within Tanzania
- Location: Karatu District, Arusha Region, Tanzania
- Coordinates: 3°35′S 35°0′E
- Type: Saline, alkaline, endorheic
- Primary inflows: Sibiti River (southwest end, clipped from image above), Baray (delta at western end), lesser seasonal rivers
- Primary outflows: none
- Basin countries: Tanzania
- Max. depth: unknown
- Surface elevation: 1,030 m (3,380 ft)
- Islands: none

Lake Eyasi (Swahili: Ziwa Eyasi; formerly German: Njarasasee, "Njarasa Lake", and Hohenlohesee, "Hohenlohe Lake") is a lake located in Karatu District of Arusha Region in north Tanzania. Lake Eyasi is the largest body of water in Arusha region. It is a seasonal shallow endorheic salt lake on the floor of the Great Rift Valley at the base of the Serengeti Plateau, just south of the Serengeti National Park and immediately southwest of the Ngorongoro Crater in the Crater Highlands of Tanzania. The lake is elongated, orientated southwest to northeast, and lies in the Eyasi-Wembere branch of the Great Rift Valley.

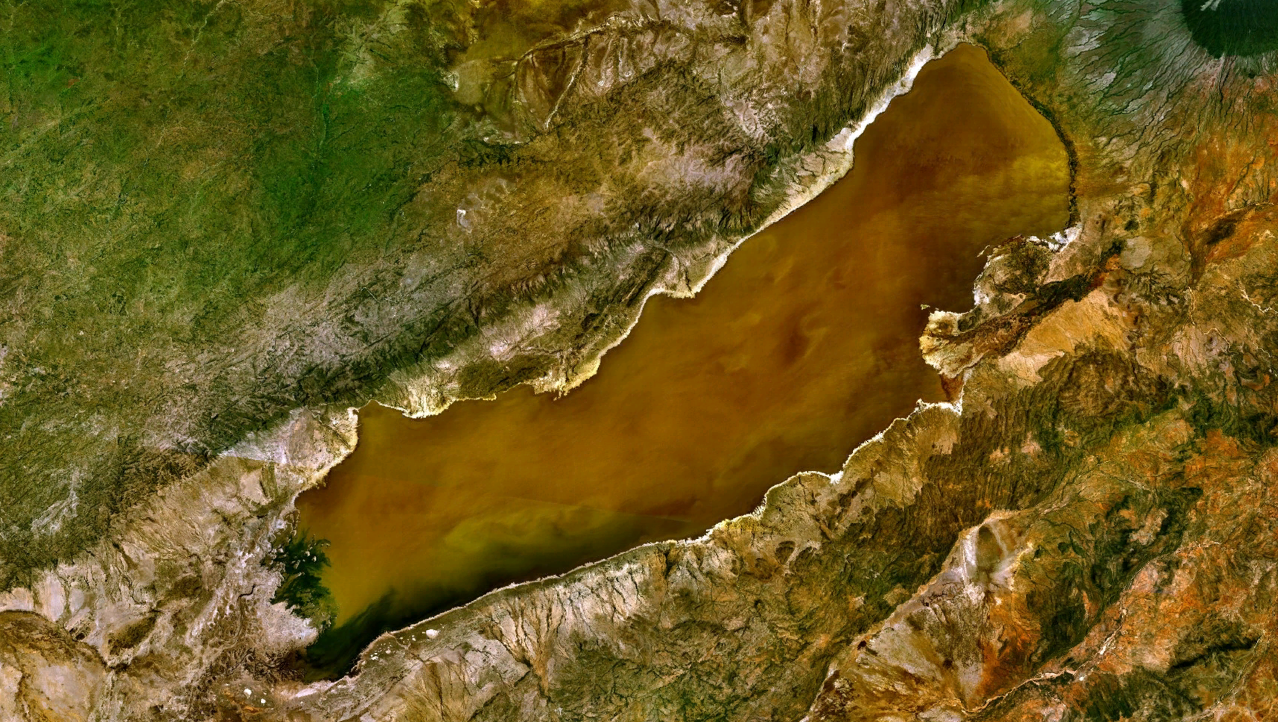
A screenshot of Lake Eyasi taken from NASA's WorldWind.

The principal inflow is the Sibiti River, which enters the southwestern end. The river may continue to flow somewhat year round, at least in wetter years; the other inflows are all seasonal. The second largest inflow is the Baray, at the northeast. The water carried by the Baray has increased in recent years due to deforestation of the Crater Highlands. The southwest flank of Mount Oldeani, one of the Ngorongoro volcanos, drains directly into the northeast end of the lake. Flow from the Budahaya / Udahaya River, which drains into the Yaeda Swamp to the southeast of the lake, was once second, but has decreased due to water diversion in the Mbulu Highlands. Water flow from the Serengeti is minor; the largest stream is the Sayu.

Seasonal water level fluctuations in the lake are dramatic, though the northwestern shore is constrained by the cliffs of the Serengeti Plateau. During the dry season the lake may dry up almost entirely, especially in drier years, so that Datooga herders and Hadza foragers will cross the lake on foot, but in El Niño years it may flood its banks and attract hippopotamus from the Serengeti. It is a seasonal stop for migrating flamingos. The lake supports minor local fishing in wet years, but more often catfish and lungfish are taken from the streams and springs that feed the lake. Even during wet periods, lake depths typically remain less than one metre.

The Hadza are the indigenous inhabitants of the lake. They are found along most of the perimeter, though camps are few along most of the Serengeti, which is Maasai territory. The Datooga inhabit the Yaeda Valley to the southeast, the Isanzu the south, and the Sukuma across the Sibiti River in the southwest. The Iraqw traditionally lived on the other side of Yaeda, but have come in increasing numbers to the Baray, which is now the primary onion-growing region of East Africa.

Mumba Cave is an archaeological site that is located by the shores of Lake Eyasi. The site has yielded a number of Middle Stone Age and Late Stone Age artifacts.
