= Julius Nyerere Hydropower Station =

Hydroelectric power plant in Morogoro Region, Tanzania

- Location in Tanzania (Location on map is approximate) Julius Nyerere Hydropower Station (Africa) Julius Nyerere Hydropower Station (Earth)
- Country: Tanzania
- Location: Stiegler's Gorge, Morogoro Region, Tanzania
- Coordinates: 07°48′19″S 37°50′44″E
- Purpose: Power
- Status: Operational
- Construction began: 2019
- Opening date: 22 August 2026
- Construction cost: US$2.9 billion
- Owner: TANESCO

Dam and spillways
- Type of dam: Roller-compacted concrete
- Impounds: Rufiji River
- Height: 134 metres (440 ft)
- Length: 1,025 metres (3,363 ft)

Reservoir
- Total capacity: 34,000,000,000 m^{3} (1.2×10^{12} cu ft)
- Catchment area: 1,200 km^{2} (460 sq mi)
- Maximum length: 100 km (62 mi)

Stiegler's Gorge Hydroelectric Power Station
- Commission date: 22 August 2026
- Installed capacity: 2,115 megawatts (2,836,000 hp)
- Annual generation: 5,920 GWh (21,300 TJ) (estimated)

Julius Nyerere Hydropower Station (JNHPP; JNHS; RHHP; Rufiji Hydroelectric Power Project; Stiegler's Gorge Dam) is a hydroelectric dam across the Rufiji River in eastern Tanzania. The power station has an installed capacity of 2,115 megawatts (2,836,000 hp). The project, power station and dam are owned by and managed by the government owned Tanzania Electric Supply Company (TANESCO). It is the largest hydropower project in Tanzania. Construction began in 2019 and was completed in 2025.

== Overview ==
The government of Tanzania has been considering establishing this power station since the 1960s. The dam is the fourth largest in Africa, the ninth largest in the world, and the largest power station in East Africa. The 134 metres (440 ft) arched, concrete dam creates a reservoir lake, 100 kilometres (62 mi), in length, measuring 1,200 square kilometres (460 mi^{2}), with 34,000,000,000 cubic metres (1.2×10^{12} ft^{3}) of water. The project, power station and dam are owned by and managed by the government owned Tanzania Electric Supply Company (TANESCO). The power station is expected to produce 5,920 GWh of electricity annually.

== History ==
In 1901 German engineer Stiegler led the first expedition to what is now known as Stiegler's Gorge to consider potential infrastructure. Stiegler, when measuring the gorge, was charged and killed by an elephant near the ravine in 1907. It was named after him in his memory. Plans for a dam were developed during British rule of Tanganyika. Alexander Telford conducted the first systematic development surveys of the Rufiji in 1928–1929, with engineer C. Gilman carrying out further studies in 1938–1940. These studies primarily envisioned irrigation infrastructure with a small dam at Stiegler's Gorge to reduce flooding and protect downstream irrigation infrastructure.

This changed in the 1950s when the Food and Agriculture Organization (FAO) started studying Rufiji River infrastructure. This included a far larger dam wall of around 100 metres (330 ft) that aimed to transform the valley to an artificial environment, providing water for agriculture. The FAO's report was published in 1961 and envisaged 200,000 hectares (490,000 acres) of irrigation.

Plans turned towards hydropower after Tanganyika's independence in 1961. President Nyerere saw hydropower dams as key deliverers of his ambitious modernisation programme. From the 1969-1974 Second Five-Year Development Plan, this modernisation plan increasingly aimed for industrialisation and therefore needed cheap electricity. This understanding of dams as developmental and of their ability to deliver cheap electricity, drove the Great Ruaha Hydropower Project with involved hydro-plants at Kidatu and Mtera. The Ruaha is an upstream tributary of the Rufiji.

Planning for the Stiegler's Gorge project advanced with three donor organisations. The Japanese External Trade Organization supported feasibility studies in the 1960s that proposed a 620 MW plant. At the same time, Nyerere's government engaged US Authorities and in particular the Bureau of Reclamation and Tennessee Valley Authority. This produced studies planning wider transformation of the Rufiji valley, with the dam enabling irrigation, industrialisation, urban water supply and a large fishery in its reservoir. The US studies also initiated the creation of the Rufiji Basin Development Authority (RUBADA), whose founding mission was to build the dam and facilitate the wider development of the valley. By the 1970s, the Norwegian NORAD development agency had taken on the Stiegler's Gorge Planning, producing detailed feasibility and construction designs.

However, these plans were never implemented. This is primarily because of the World Bank's decision to reject project finance. In the 1980s, the bank was the major financier of dams in developing countries and particularly significant in Tanzania, which was enduring an economic crisis at the time. The World Bank questioned the need for a dam at Stiegler's Gorge, given their calculation of limited growth in Tanzania's electricity demand. There were also growing environmental concerns around the project, prompting the first Environmental Impact Assessment in Tanzania. These concerns were magnified by the designation of the Selous Game Reserve, in which the gorge sits, as a UNESCO World Heritage Site in 1982. The World Bank and other international donors consequently turned to the smaller and less-impactful Kidatu and Pangani Falls Dams in the 1990s.

However, Kikwete's government resurrected plans for the dam in 2006. This came with the country's emergence from economic crises in the 1980s and 1990s to a period of sustained economic growth. The resurrection of the project also reacted to a severe power crisis in Tanzania from 2004 to 2006 that saw widespread load shedding. Maximising the fiscal advantage of the country's increasing economy, early speeches by government ministers in 2006 indicated that the Stiegler's Dam would be a priority. The Minister of Energy and Minerals also confirmed the dam's status in the 2009 Power Sector Master Plan. The decision gave renewed purpose to Rubada, the agency tasked with implementing the dam, who started actively lobbying for the project and meeting companies.

A series of companies expressed interest in developing the project. Under Kikwete's government, and like other energy sector projects, the dam was supposed to be developed by the private sector. This involved unsolicited bids by private companies for agreements with the government to build the project. The companies would then use these deals, such as power purchase agreements, to raise finance and start construction. The first such bid was made by IDF (Infrastructure Development Finance Ltd) of South Africa and Energen of Canada in 2006–2008. Sinohydro also reportedly placed a bid around 2008.

However, the main engagement came from Brazil. After meetings between Brazilian diplomats and Tanzanian ministers, including the visit of Brazilian president Lula to Tanzania in 2010, both governments agreed to support Stiegler's Gorge Dam's construction. A number of exchanges between the two countries happened between 2009 and 2012. This supported the Brazilian company Odebrecht. They signed a memorandum of understanding with Rubada in 2012 to build the dam. Odebrecht also undertook feasibility and design studies and commissioned an environmental impact report. However, Tanzanian interest in the dam appeared to stall by 2014, delaying any implementation.

This changed when President Magufuli came to power in 2015. In 2017, he announced that the Stiegler's Gorge Dam would be a flagship development project of his government and would be financed by the government rather than developed by the private sector. A first round of bidding for the construction tenders was held in the autumn of 2017. This was unsuccessful, initiating a second round in spring 2018. Arab Contractors and El Sewedy Electric, both Egyptian firms, won the bid. Magufuli has been vocal in denouncing any critics of the dam and his interior minister threatened that opponents would be jailed in a public speech.

As of April 2025, all nine turbines were operational, generating 2,115 megawatts of power. The completed renewable power project was commissioned on 22 August 2026 by Samia Suluhu Hassan, the President of Tanzania. Also present was Mostafa Madbouly, the Prime Minister of Egypt.

== Location ==
The dam was built across the Rufiji River, at Stiegler's Gorge, in the Selous Game Reserve, Pwani Region, approximately 220 kilometres (137 mi), by road, southwest of Dar es Salaam.

This power station is located in Selous Game Reserve, one of the world's largest World Heritage Sites, measuring 45,000 square kilometres (17,000 mi^{2}). The power station and reservoir lake occupy approximately 1,350 square kilometres (520 mi^{2}), within the game reserve.

== Contract ==
In August 2017, the Tanzanian government advertised for bids to construct this dam. The selected contractor is expected to complete the dam in no more than 36 months. The power generated will be transmitted via a new 400kV high voltage power line to a substation where the power will be integrated into the national electricity grid. The government of Ethiopia is advising the Tanzanian government on the implementation of this project.

Although the World Heritage Committee had reiterated its grave concern about Tanzania's decision to move forward on the project and added it to the grounds for the Selous Game Reserve to be on the List of World Heritage in Danger, which grounds previously were only concerned with elephant poaching.

In October 2018, after diplomatic negotiations between Tanzania's President Magufuli and Egypt's President Sisi, the government of Tanzania awarded the design and construction contract for this power project to the Egyptian company Arab Contractors together with the Egyptian manufacturing company El Sewedy Electric, at a budgeted cost of US$2.9 billion (TSh6.558 trillion).

In February 2019, the government of Tanzania handed the construction site over to the contractors. Allowing several months to mobilize equipment, actual construction did not start until the summer of 2019. In April 2019, the Tanzanian government made an upfront payment of US$309.645 million, representing approximately 15 percent total cost of construction.

=== Redesign and construction ===
In 2018, a new design for Stiegler's Gorge Dam was unveiled. A 131m high and 700m wide dam wall is under construction. The hydropower plant is planned to have an installed capacity of 2,115 megawatts. If completed on time in 2022, this would be Africa's 2 largest dam by installed capacity, after Ethiopia GERD Dam 5100 megawatts, over Egypt's Aswan High Dam (2100 megawatts), Mozambique's Cahora Bassa Dam (2075 megawatts), and Angola's Lauca Dam (2070 megawatts).

At 2,115 megawatts, the dam's contribution is more than the current peak demand of Tanzania. The country's highest recorded power demand was 1051.27 megawatts in February 2017. Installed capacity has been reported to be between 1366.60 megawatts and 1,602 megawatts. The Stiegler's Gorge Hydropower Project will therefore significantly increase the installed capacity on-grid in Tanzania, supporting power for industrialisation and electrification.

A key rationale for new electricity generation are Tanzania's regular electricity crises. The majority of Tanzania's power shortfalls occur in the dry season and in below-average rainfall years, this causes electricity shortages which are socially and economically damaging. For instance, load shedding between 2014 and 2015 supposedly cost between 5-7% of Tanzania's GDP.

In preparation for the start of construction, Magufuli ordered Tanesco to prepare the site. Contracts were awarded to clear the construction area, prepare a road for large vehicles and provide power and water. The government also handed out rights to log the large reservoir area, which could bring in significant revenue.

Arab Contractors, a public sector Egyptian firm would undertake the civil engineering works while El Sewedy Electric would install the electro-mechanical equipment including the turbines, generators and transmission lines. They signed contracts with the state-owned energy utility company TANESCO. The government has publicly stated that the dam will be financed by Tanzania's national budget, yet no funding package was announced and the World Bank and other financiers rejecting support for the dam. Elsewedy have secured a loan of $500 million from the African Export-Import Bank, with guarantees from the United Bank for Africa and CRDB Bank, which they plan to repay through the project contract. After the allocation of a portion of the national budget for the project in 2018, in February 2019, the government will officially hand over to the contractors.

As of June 2020, the project was 40 percent complete. By January 2021 the bypass tunnel for the dam site was functional and excavation of the 50m deep dam base was in progress. The three head-race tunnels, which will supply nine penstocks for the nine turbines, were under construction. The nine turbines are each to have a capacity of 235 MW. Foundation for the power house was also in progress.

=== Construction risks ===
The Stiegler's Gorge Dam's financial costs are contested. When Odebrecht rewrote feasibility and design studies for the dam in 2013, they estimated that it would cost £3.6 billion. The government used this figure in announcing the new design and feasibility study in 2018. However, Hartmann claims the underlying costs have changed, in the price of concrete and construction costs and in engineering services. Using contemporary dam cases, he suggests that, after excluding socio-environmental mitigation, the current cost estimation should be US$7.57billion, rising to US$9.8billion if a conservative amount of overrun is factored in.

Tanzania has not announced any funding agreements for the dam's construction. Given the country's economy and tax base, there are doubts about whether the government has sufficient revenue to build the dam. These are particularly relevant given specific outstanding debt issues with the electricity utility, who has signed the contracts for the Stiegler's Gorge Dam's construction. This financial situation could delay or stop payments to the contractors which would harm or derail construction.

Additional risks come from the choice of the two contractors. According to their public profiles, Dye claims that neither company has had experience of dam construction, and rather primarily builds commercial and residential buildings and transmission lines.

This is deeply surprising given both companies inexperience. Arab Contractors reportedly worked on Aswan Dam in the 1960s, but would only have been one of many sub-contractors on the Russian-led project. A review of their website reveals that the company has been involved in the construction of buildings over the last decade, not on any large hydraulic or power-generation projects. Meanwhile Elsewedy appears mainly to have built transmission lines, not complex electro-mechanical systems.

— Barnaby Dye

This lack of experience is notable given the size of Stiegler's Gorge Dam and the degree of hydrological flux in the Rufiji River. There has not been a supervising, 'owner's engineer' appointed to ensure the quality of construction.

This contracting arrangement and the appointed companies entail important risks. Some of these are technical, concerning the construction of a project that stands up and functions (producing electricity) for the intended 50 years. This will depend on the accuracy and rigour of hydrology, sediment, climatic and hydropower studies and the engineers' ability to accurately implement complex designs. There would also be a project management issue in undertaking infrastructure on this scale with recruitment estimated at 4000 plus personnel and a number of sub-contractors. Neither company appears to have experience of management on this scale. In its most extreme sense, this raises questions about dam safety, both in the construction phases and in the end product. A number of dam collapses such as the St. Francis Dam (USA) or Malpasset Dam (France) stemmed from poor studies and insufficient engineering standards.

Another risk concerns environmental and social impacts. Given inexperience, the companies are unlikely to be familiar with mitigation codes of practice that could limit impacts, e.g. stopping dumping of soil in the river or in handling waste. There are also concerns over dam safety for workers, given the long history of accidents on dam projects before extra industry efforts in the 21st century.

There are also significant concerns over poaching which has been a longstanding issue in the Selous Game Reserve. Poaching was the primary reason for placing the UNESCO World Heritage Selous Game Reserve on a list of endangered sites. The increased presence of people and steady flow of construction traffic, as well as logging camps, provides substantive opportunities for poaching and smuggling, especially if the companies do not have know-how to enforce anti-poaching measures. Thus, the choice of the contractors magnify the pre-existing risks of undertaking the Stiegler's Gorge project.

== Risks to operation ==
There are a number of risks to the effective functioning of the Stiegler's Gorge Hydropower Project, if it is completed. One of these comes from climate change. It is unclear if the total rainfall in Tanzania will increase or decrease, but studies suggest that precipitation's variability will increase. This is important as it will affect hydropower production, decreasing the dam's electricity-generation reliability. This is particularly important in the context of hydro-dependency. Tanzania gets the majority of its electricity from hydropower. A failure in these dams in the dry season is the key reason for the country's power failures, which happen frequently. This vulnerability will increase if the Stiegler's Gorge Dam is completed. If brought online today, a failure of the Stiegler's Gorge Hydropower Plant would reduce power production by 58.3%.

The other risk comes from sedimentation. A report highlighted the vulnerability of the reservoir to rapid sedimentation. This is because of the existing sediment load in the Rufiji River and the high levels of erosion likely to occur around the reservoir. Higher sedimentation would decrease the reservoir's capacity to store water. Such a reduction would reduce the reliability of the reservoir, as it would make it more directly dependent on precipitation.

Another fiscal danger comes from the ability of Tanzania's electricity utility, TANESCO, to sell the hydro-plant's energy. Given Tanzania's current peak capacity of around 1.05 GW and installed capacity of 1.5 GW, there are persistent doubts about whether Tanzania can sell the dam's energy. A number of reports cast doubt on the ability of the Tanzanian economy and electrification schemes to absorb the dam's supply. Without such sales, the government will not easily recoup their investment. These reports also suggest that selling to the regional grid, to neighbouring countries through the Southern and Eastern African Power Pools, is unlikely to work given that both trading schemes are insufficiently institutionalised. There also appears to be a high level of distrust between countries when it comes to relying on others for power.

== Negative impacts ==
Academics and consultants have established the Stiegler's Gorge Dam's impacts. They have argued that the significant level of environmental and social effects constitute an important trade-off in pursuing Stiegler's Gorge Dam.

=== Environmental impacts ===
The key controversy of the proposed Stiegler's Gorge project concerns its environmental impacts. An obvious concern is the location of the gorge in the middle of the Selous Game Reserve World Heritage Site. Firstly, the dam will flood over 2.2% of the reserve's total area, roughly equivalent to the size of Andorra, reducing its forest and riverine habitat.

Additionally, the dam project would be directly above the main area of biodiversity in the reserve. This consists of a large wetland, marsh and savanna area. The Rufiji River plays a central role in creating this environment. In the wet season, this river has a particularly strong hydrological surge. This force of water during the wet season changes the Rufiji River's path, creating a shifting pattern of oxbow lakes, dried river channels and wetland. Collectively this creates a rich habitat contrasting with surrounding dry savannah.

The Rufiji River has a strong seasonal variation. In the wet season, it floods a large area of land, irrigating the soil and spreading nutrient sediments. The wet season also refills and connects lakes in the Selous Reserve.

Building a dam will change this seasonal river pattern and withhold sediment. It will create a more constant hydrological discharge, reducing the wet season flood. This will undermine the ecological irrigating and fertilising services of the river. The Stiegler's Gorge Dam will therefore harm the wetland areas of the Selous and the wide variety of mammal and bird life that use it, including numerous waders, storks and herons as well as hippopotamuses and crocodiles. Large, land-based mammals from elephants to lions also benefit from the presence of the water, particularly in the dry season.

The Selous contains a number of endangered species, including lion, Sanje crested Mangaby, wetland crane, lesser kestrel, Udzungwa red colobus monkey, Udzungwa forest partridge and rufous-winged partridge. Impact assessments indicate these could be affected by a future project.

The dam will mean that downstream oxbow lakes are cut-off, become more saline from evaporation and will reduce in size. Cutting-off the lakes will also prevent the regeneration of fish stocks, particularly migratory fish. A study by Duvail et al. found that these negative impacts would occur even with a mitigating flood release of 2,500cms. For instance, this proposed water release would end at least two of the downstream lakes.

Below the Selous Game Reserve is the Rufiji River Delta. This delta area, including Mafia Island, is protected by the highest international level of wetland protection, called the Ramsar Convention. The ecology of this area also depends on the river's seasonal nature. The wet season's river-water surge counteracts the saline sea, maintaining a balance of salinity in the delta that underpins its current plant and animal mix. This salinity balance supports the largest mangrove stand in East Africa.

The river's wet season surge, because it brings a large volume of fertile sediments, also supports an algal bloom in the ocean delta. This bloom spawns a rapid annual explosion in plankton, which in-turn supports a rapid increase in fish. Migratory whale sharks and other animals also visit the delta area in the wet season to specifically take advantage of this bloom.

By altering the river's flow and withholding sediment, the dam will therefore damage the UNESCO Selous Site, downstream lakes and the Ramsar-protected delta area.

=== Social impacts on livelihoods ===
Impacts on the environment will have important socio-economic effects. The river's annual irrigating and fertilising flood creates a rich area of farmland below the park. Typically, this supports recession agriculture that takes place in the dry season. Indeed, the Rufiji valley contains some of Tanzania's richest farmland, including extensive paddy fields. People living in the valley also utilise lakes which are replenished by annual floods. These lakes provide a source for irrigation and a useful fish stock. Therefore, a change caused by the dam will negatively impact people's livelihoods downstream.

Another key impact is on fishing in the Rufiji River delta. This area is Tanzania's economically richest fishery, centred on prawns. Prawns and other fish numbers are underpinned by the river's wet season pulse. Building the Stiegler's Gorge Dam will therefore harm fisheries around the Rufiji delta.

Another direct impact of the dam will be on tourism. This will be twofold. The main photo-tourist area of the Selous is the part of the reserve immediately below the gorge. The remainder of the park is for hunting tourism and will be negatively affected by construction. The building of the dam will bring a visual impact on this area because of the improved roads and large number of vehicles transporting materials to the dam. The hydropower plant will also require transmission lines. The Beho Beho Hills will visually shield the dam itself. Regardless, the short and long-term negative impacts on the wildlife of the park will undermine the reason for hunting and photo tourism.

Particularly large Rufiji floods can significantly damage the communities living along the Rufiji River. This happened in 1968 for instance when floods destroyed crops, houses and infrastructure. However, research demonstrates that many people living in the valley value such large floods, seeing them as a blessing in the longer term, not a plague. This is because of a perception of the floods as agriculturally important. Floodwater spreads more sediment creating rich agricultural conditions in for the following years.

On the other hand, the project is expected to provide employment opportunities and invaluable experience to many Tanzanian engineers.

== See also ==
- List of power stations in Tanzania
- Eastern Africa Power Pool
- Southern African Power Pool

== Sources ==
- Taming Exotic Beauties: Swedish Hydro Power Constructions in Tanzania in the Era of Development Assistance, 1960s - 1990s, Stockholm, 2007, PhD Thesis, by Öhman, May-Britt.
