= List of power stations in Tanzania =

Hydroelectric power stations in Tanzania

The following page lists all power stations in Tanzania.

== Hydroelectric ==
Hydroelectric station	Region	Coordinates	River	Type	Name of reservoir	Capacity (MW)	Average energy (GWh)	Firm energy (GWh)	Year completed
Hale Power Station	Tanga	5°17′S 38°36′E	Pangani River	Run-of-the-river		21	93	55	1964
Nyumba ya Mungu Power Station	Kilimanjaro	3°49′S 37°28′E	Mount Kilimanjaro Streams	Reservoir	Nyumba ya Mungu Reservoir	8	36	20	1967
Kidatu Power Station	Morogoro	7°38′S 36°53′E	Rufiji River	Reservoir	Kidatu Dam	204	1,111	601	1975
Mtera Power Station	Dodoma	7°08′S 35°59′E	Rufiji River	Reservoir	Mtera Reservoir	80	429	195	1988
Uwemba Power Station	Njombe	9°27′S 34°47′E		Run-of-the-river		0.84	7.3	2.3	1991
New Pangani Power Station	Tanga	5°20′S 38°39′E	Pangani River	Reservoir		68	341	201	1994
Kihansi Power Station	Morogoro	8°34′S 35°51′E	Kihansi River	Reservoir	Kihansi Reservoir	180	694	492	2000
Mwenga Power Station	Iringa	8°37′S 35°41′E		Run-of-the-river		4	24	6	2012
Rusumo Hydroelectric Power Station	Kagera	2°22′S 30°47′E	Kagera River	Run-of-the-river		80	253	129	2023 (expected)
Songwe Power Station	Mbeya	09°27′11″S 33°05′47″E	Songwe River	Reservoir	Songwe Basin Reservoir	180			2023 (expected)
Julius Nyerere Hydropower Station	Morogoro	07°48′19″S 37°50′44″E	Rufiji River	Reservoir	Stiegler's Lake	2,115	5,920		2024 (expected)
Kikonge Power Station	Ruvuma	10°30′29″S 34°43′46″E	Ruhuhu River	Reservoir		300	1,268	883	2025 (expected)
Kakono Hydroelectric Power Station	Kagera	1.0521935°S 30.9104841°E	Kagera River	Run-of-the-river		87.8	524		2028 (expected)

== Thermal ==
Thermal power station	Community	Coordinates	Fuel type	Capacity (MW)	Year completed or completion expected	Name of owner	Notes
PAP Diesel Power Station	Dar es Salaam	6.6741°S 39.1873°E	Diesel	100	2002	PAP	
Ubungo I Thermal Power Station	Dar es Salaam		Natural gas	100	2007	Tanesco	
Ubungo II Thermal Power Station	Dar es Salaam		Natural gas	120	2011	Symbion Power Limited	
Tegeta Thermal Power Station	Dar es Salaam		Natural gas	45	2011	Tanesco	
Mtwara Thermal Power Station	Mtwara	10.259732°S 40.038604°E	Natural gas	18	2008	Tanesco	
Somanga Thermal Power Station	Somanga	8.416667°S 39.28333340°E	Natural gas	7.5	2010	Tanesco	
Dodoma Thermal Power Station	Dodoma		Diesel	55	2011	Symbion Power Limited	
Songas Thermal Power Station	Dar es Salaam		Natural gas	180	2004	Songas Power Limited	
Arusha Thermal Power Station	Arusha		Diesel	50	2012	Symbion Power Limited	
Nyakato Diesel Power Station	Mahango	2.5423°S 32.9662°E	Heavy fuel oil	60	2013	Tanesco	
Kinyerezi I Thermal Power Station	Kinyerezi	6.8583°S 39.1550°E	Natural gas or jet fuel	150	2015	Tanesco	
Kinyerezi II Thermal Power Station	Kinyerezi	6.8589°S 39.1508°E	Natural gas	240	2018	Tanesco	
Dangote Industries Tanzania Thermal Power Station	Mtwara	10.309167°S 40.178333°E	Natural gas	45	2018	Dangote Industries Tanzania Limited	

== Wind ==
Station	Location	Capacity (MW)	Commissioned	Notes
Miombo Hewani Wind Power Station	08°37′51″S 34°48′39″E	300	2024 (expected)	Owned by Windlab Developments Tanzania Limited

== See also ==
- List of power stations in Africa
- List of largest power stations in the world
