= Kilwa Thermal Power Station =

Power station in Tanzania

- Location of Kilwa Thermal Power Station in Tanzania
- Country: Tanzania
- Location: Kilwa, Lindi Region
- Coordinates: 08°53′24″S 39°30′16″E
- Status: Planned
- Commission date: 2022 (Expected)
- Owner: Tanzania National Electricity Supply Company

Thermal power station
- Primary fuel: Liquefied Natural Gas

Power generation
- Nameplate capacity: 318 megawatts (426,000 hp)

Kilwa Thermal Power Station, is a planned 318 megawatts, liquefied natural gas-fired thermal power station in Tanzania.

== Location ==
The power station would be located in the coastal city of Kilwa, in the Lindi Region, in the southeastern part of the country, approximately 325 kilometres (202 mi), by road, south of Dar es Salaam, Tanzania's largest city and financial capital.

== Overview ==
The power station would be owned and operated by Tanzania National Electricity Supply Company, the national parastatal electricity generator, transmitter and distributor. The new power plant is expected to add 318 megawatts to the national generating capacity of 1500 megawatts, as of July 2018.

== Financing ==
As of July 2018, the Trade and Development Bank has committed to lend US$200 towards the construction of this power station. In the same month, Credit Suisse, the Swiss multinational investment bank, committed US$200 in credit to Tanzania towards energy and transportation infrastructure projects, that include this power station.

== See also ==
- Tanzania Power Stations
- Africa Power Stations
- World Power Stations
