= Hale Dam =

- Map of Tanzania showing the location of Hale Dam
- Interactive map of Hale Dam
- Official name: Hale Power Station
- Location: Hale, Mnyuzi, Korogwe District, Tanga, Tanzania
- Coordinates: 05°17′53.3″S 38°36′14.8″E
- Construction began: 1961
- Opening date: 1964
- Construction cost: £5,000,000 (1964)
- Owner: TANESCO

Dam and spillways
- Impounds: Pangani River
- Spillway type: Earth and Rock Fill
- Spillway capacity: 1,190 m^{3} (0.96 acre⋅ft)

Power Station
- Operator: Tanesco
- Commission date: 1964
- Turbines: 2x10.5
- Installed capacity: 21 MW (28,000 hp)
- Website; Tanesco website

Hale Dam is a hydroelectric dam in Tanzania, located in the town of Hale in Mnyuzi ward of Korogwe District of Tanga Region. Its installed capacity is 21 megawatts (28,000 hp). Thousands of people were displaced to build the dam.

== History ==
The Hale Dam is the oldest operation dam currently in the country. The Pangani river basin had been a source of power since the early colonial times for Tanganyika. The lower Pangani power plant was established at Pangani Falls by a German company as early as 1936. With the growing Tanga region and the close proximity to Mombasa, the government decided to construct a new Hydro electric power plant in Hale.

The plant began construction in 1961 and cost around £5,000,000, which was the single largest investment into the country since the failed groundnut scheme. The power-plant became operational in November 1964.

== Overview ==
The Hale hydro electric Power Plant utilizes a natural fall of 70 meters. It is sited at Hale Township on the Segera–Tanga highway, 6 km from the Tanga – Moshi junction at Segera.

Water from the neighboring rivers is channeled and dropped 70 meters below the ground surface. The power-plant itself is based 76 meters below the surface. The underground power station generates power by two vertical units comprising Francis turbines and salient pole generators and has an installed capacity of 21 MW (28,000 hp).

The plant has undergone major refits twice since its inauguration, in 1987 and 2009.

The construction of the dam in the 1960s led to the displacement of about 12,000 people. However, after the establishment of the dam, with a big supply of water and fish, it attracted a large proportion of migrants from fishing communities. This has also led to the establishment of big urban settlements called Nyumba ya Mungu, with an estimated population of about 20,000 people in 2002. The growing population led to a lot of water conflicts.

== See also ==
- Tanesco
