= Somanga Thermal Power Station =

Power station in Tanzania

- Location of Somanga Thermal Power Station
- Country: Tanzania
- Location: Somanga, Lindi Region, Tanzania
- Coordinates: 08°25′00″S 39°17′00″E
- Status: Operational
- Construction began: 2007
- Commission date: 14 August 2010
- Owner: Tanesco
- Operator: Tanesco

Thermal power station
- Primary fuel: Natural gas

Power generation
- Nameplate capacity: 7.5 MW (10,100 hp)

External links
- Website: www.tanesco.co.tz

Somanga Thermal Power Station is a 7.5 MW (10,100 hp), natural gas powered, electricity generating power station in Tanzania.

== Location ==
The power-plant is located in the village of Somanga-Fungu, Kilwa District, in Lindi Region, in southeastern Tanzania, approximately 217 kilometres (135 mi), by road, north of Lindi, the location of the regional headquarters. This is about 241 kilometres (150 mi), by road, south of Dar es Salaam, Tanzania's largest city.

== Overview ==
Somanga Power Station is owned and operated by Tanesco, the Tanzanian electricity distribution monopoly. It was constructed between 2007 and 2010, with a loan from the World Bank. The power generated is evacuated by two separate 33kV power lines to Kilwa and Ikwiriri. Power is then distributed to the neighboring communities of Kilwa Kivinje, Nangurukuru, Somanga, Muhoro, Ikwiriri, Kibiti and Bungu. As at September 2016, this power station was not connected to the Tanzanian national electricity grid.

== Operations ==
The power plant operates on natural gas sources from Songo Songo Island via pipeline. The plant has three Jenbacher engines, each with a generating capacity of 2.5MW, bringing installed capacity to 7.5MW.

== Future plans ==
The government of Tanzania has plans to build a grid-connected gas-powered electricity power station at Somanga-Fungu village near or at the location of the present installation. The new power plant will have installed capacity of 200MW to 400MW. A financial adviser has been selected to advise government on the project.

== See also ==
- Tanzania Electric Supply Company Limited
- List of power stations in Tanzania
- Economy of Tanzania
