= Great Ruaha River =

River in Iringa, Dodoma and Morogoro Region, Tanzania

Coordinates: 7°56′S 37°52′E

Great Area Ruaha River
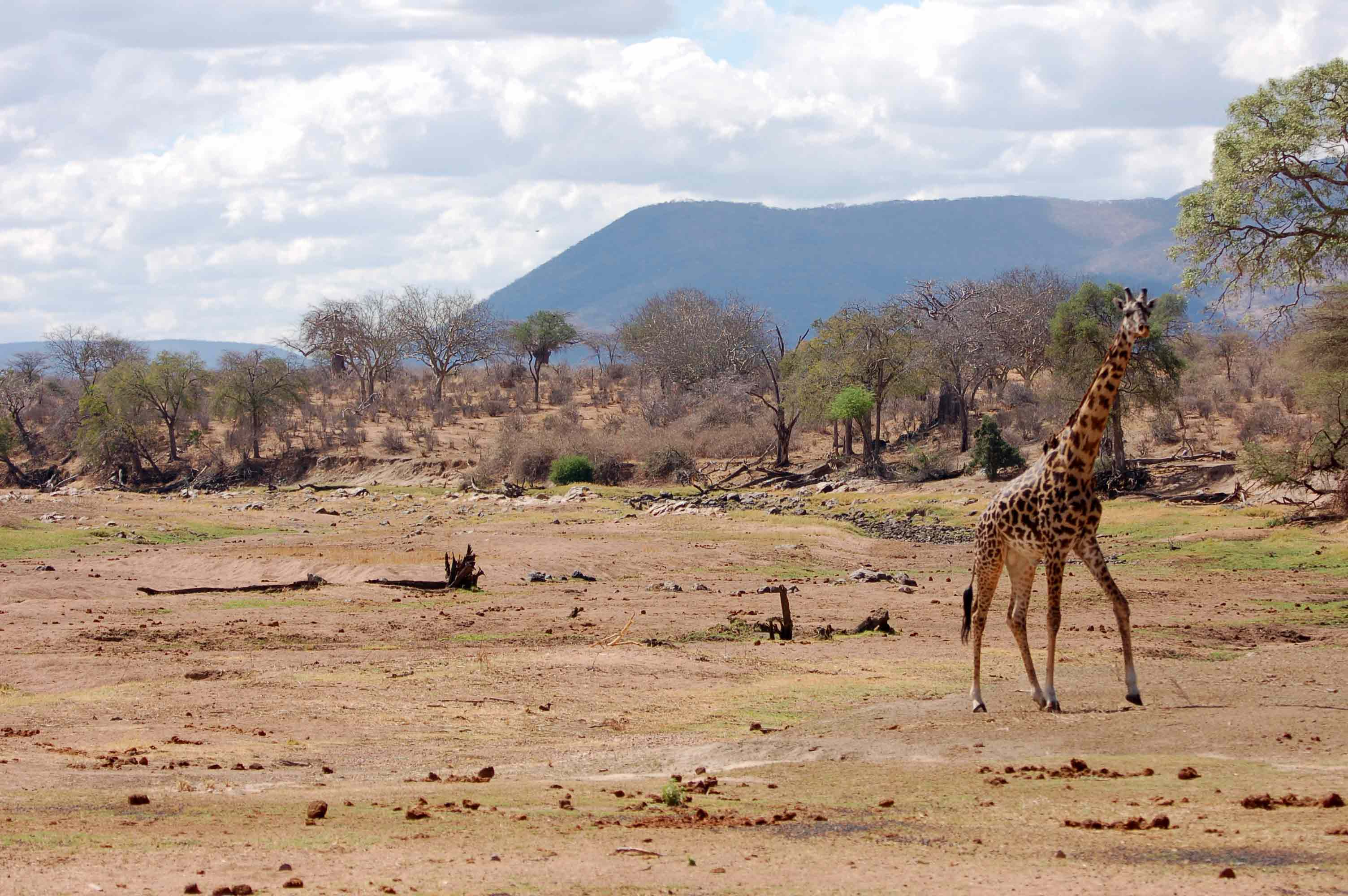
- The Great Ruaha River dry bed (2006)

Location
- Country: Tanzania
- Region: Iringa Region
- Region: Dodoma Region
- Region: Morogoro Region

Physical characteristics
- Source: Lukosi River
  - location: Iringa Region
- 2nd source: Yovi River
  - location: Morogoro Region
- 3rd source: Kitete River
  - location: Morogoro Region
- 4th source: Sanje River
  - location: Iringa Region
- 5th source: Little Ruaha River
  - location: Iringa Region
- Mouth: Rufiji River
  - location: Pwani Region
- Length: 475 km (295 mi)
- Basin size: 83,970 square kilometres (32,421 sq mi)

The Great Ruaha River is a river in south-central Tanzania that flows through the Usangu wetlands and the Ruaha National Park east into the Rufiji River. It traverses and marks the borders between Iringa Region, Dodoma Region and Morogoro Region. The Great Ruaha river has a basin catchment area of 83,970 square kilometres (32,421 sq mi). The population of the basin is mainly sustained by irrigation and water-related livelihoods such as fishing and livestock keeping.

== Size ==
Great Ruaha is about 475 kilometres (295 mi) long, its tributary basin has a catchment area of 68,000 square kilometres (26,000 sq mi) and the mean annual discharge is 140 cubic metres (4,900 cu ft) per second. The Great Ruaha River supplies 22 percent of the total flow of the Rufiji catchment system. Thirty-eight species of fish have been identified in the Great Ruaha River.

The river's headwaters are in the Kipengere Range In west Njombe Region. From there the Great Ruaha River descends to the Usangu plains, an important region for irrigated agriculture and livestock in Tanzania. The river eventually reaches the Mtera Dam and then flows south to the Kidatu Dam. These two generate about 50 percent of Tanzania's electricity. The river continues southwards and flows across the Selous Game Reserve before reaching the Rufiji River. The major rivers contributing to the Great Ruaha River are Lukosi, Yovi, Kitete, Sanje, Little Ruaha, Kisigo, Mbarali, Kimani, and Chimala whereas the small ones include Umrobo, Mkoji, Lunwa, Mlomboji, Ipatagwa, Mambi, and Mswiswi rivers.

== Issues ==
Decreased flows in the Great Ruaha have been recorded since the early 1990s, resulting in complete drying of sections of the river in 1993 and in dry years since (illustration above). This has been attributed to uncontrolled and poor water management, with the large rice irrigation schemes playing a major role.

By 2019, the Great Ruaha experienced no water flow for several months per year. A report published by the World Bank listed the Great Ruaha as an endowment in crisis due to environmental factors.

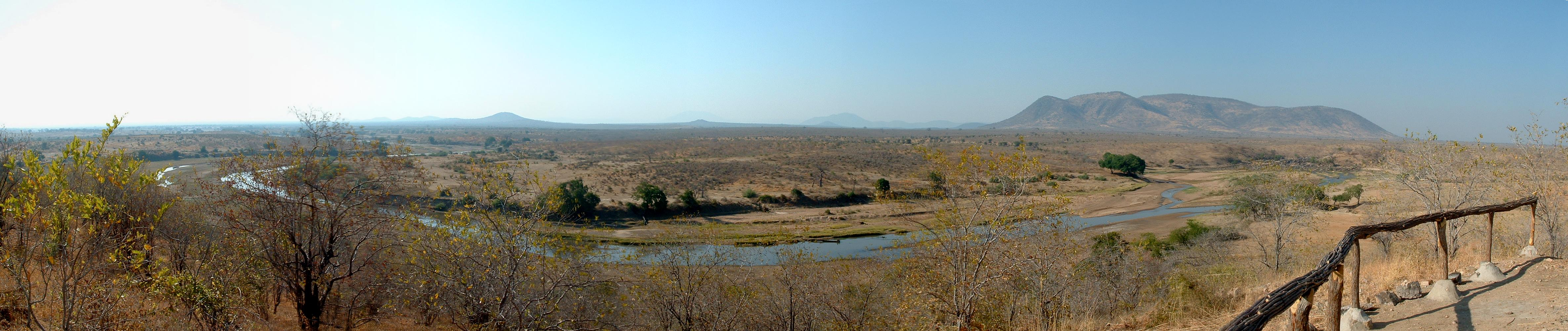
Panorama of Ruaha National Park, with a view on the Great Ruaha River on 27 July 2003.

== Sources ==
- WWF.org - The Ruaha Water Programme
- Ruaha information with images
- FAO review
- FAO - fact sheet on the ecohydrology of the Great Ruaha River (2003)
- Öhman, May-Britt, Taming Exotic Beauties: Swedish Hydro Power Constructions in Tanzania in the Era of Development Assistance, 1960s - 1990s, Stockholm, 2007, PhD Thesis,
