= Kinyerezi II Thermal Power Station =

Power station in Tanzania

- Country: Tanzania
- Location: Kinyerezi Complex, Dar es Salaam, Tanzania
- Coordinates: 06°51′32″S 39°09′03″E
- Status: Operational
- Construction began: 24 March 2016
- Commission date: 3 April 2018
- Construction cost: US$344 million
- Owner: Tanesco
- Operator: Tanesco

Thermal power station
- Primary fuel: Natural gas

Power generation
- Nameplate capacity: 240 MW (320,000 hp)

External links
- Website: www.tanesco.co.tz

Kinyerezi II Thermal Power Station is a 240 MW (320,000 hp), natural gas powered, electricity generating power station in Tanzania.

== Location ==
The power plant is located in Kinyerezi Ward, in Ilala District, in Dar es Salaam, the commercial capital and largest city in Tanzania. The plant lies adjacent to the 150 megawatts (200,000 hp) gas-fired power station, Kinyerezi I Thermal Power Station.

== Overview ==
Kinyerezi II Power Station is owned and operated by Tanesco, the Tanzanian electricity distribution monopoly. It was constructed between March 2014 and April 2018, by Sumitomo Corporation, partially funded by loans from Sumitomo Mitsui Banking Corporation and the Japan Bank for International Cooperation. Kinyerezi II Power Plant is equipped with Mitsubishi Power H-25 gas turbines. The phase consists of 6 gas turbines. As of 3 April 2018, the power station had capacity of 167.82 megawatts (225,050 hp), with ongoing expansion to the full 240 megawatts (320,000 hp). The power generated is evacuated via high-voltage cables to a nearby substation, where it is integrated into the Tanzanian national electricity grid. The power plant operates on natural gas.

In October 2018, The EastAfrican, an English daily newspaper reported that the expansion of Kinyerezi II was complete and commissioning of the expanded power station was imminent.

== Future plans ==
While Kinyerezi II's capacity is being increased to 240 megawatts, the government of Tanzania has plans to expand Kinyerezi I Power Station from the current 150 megawatts to 335 megawatts, by February 2019. There are other plans to build two new gas-fired plants; Kinyerezi III (600 megawatts) and Kinyerezi IV (450 megawatts).

== Funding ==
The funding of the construction of Kinyerezi II Power Plant, is as depicted in the table below:

Kinyerezi II Thermal Power Station Construction Funding
Rank	Development Partner	Contribution in Dollars	Percentage	Notes
1	Sumitomo Mitsui Bank & Japan Bank for International Cooperation	292.0 million	85.0	Soft Loan
3	Government of Tanzania	51.6 million	15.0	Equity Investment
	Total	334.0 million	100.00	

== See also ==
- Tanzania Electric Supply Company Limited
- List of power stations in Tanzania
- Economy of Tanzania
