= Kakono Hydroelectric Power Station =

Hydroelectric Power Station in Tanzania

Kakono Power Station
- Map of Tanzania showing the location of Kakono Power Station
- Country: Tanzania
- Location: Kakono, Kagera Region
- Coordinates: 1.0521935°S 30.9104841°E
- Purpose: Power
- Status: Under construction
- Construction began: 1 April 2023
- Opening date: 31 December 2028 (Expected)
- Construction cost: US$321.43 million
- Owner: Tanzania Electric Supply Company (TANESCO)
- Operator: TANESCO

Dam and spillways
- Type of dam: Run of river
- Impounds: Kagera River

Reservoir
- Normal elevation: 1,300 m (4,300 ft)

Power Station
- Commission date: December 2028 (Expected)
- Installed capacity: 87.8 MW (117,700 hp)
- Annual generation: 524 GWh

Kakono Hydroelectric Power Station, also referred to as Kakono Power Station, is a 87.8 MW (117,700 hp) hydroelectric power station, under construction in Tanzania.

== Location ==
The power station is located across the Kagera River, in the Kagera Region, close to the International border with Uganda. This location lies approximately 90 kilometres (56 mi) west of the lakeside city of Bukoba.

The new power station will be built across the Kagera River, downstream of the 80 MW (110,000 hp) Rusumo Hydroelectric Power Station, the 16 MW (21,000 hp) Kikagati Hydroelectric Power Station and the 39 MW (52,000 hp) Nshungyezi Hydroelectric Power Station.

== Overview ==
Kakono Power Station is a run-of-river hydropower plant, with planned capacity installation of 87.8 MW (117,700 hp), when completed. The project will involve the construction of a gravity roller-compacted concrete dam. The new infrastructure includes a new above-ground power station, an adjacent substation, a new 220kV high voltage transmission line that measures 39 kilometres (24 mi) in length and a new 220kV/33kV substation at Kyaka, where the electricity generated at Kakono will enter the Tanzanian grid.

== Funding ==
The table below outlines the sources of funding for Kakono Hydroelectric Power Station.

Kakono Hydroelectric Power Station Funding
Rank	Development Partner	Contribution in Euros	US Dollar Equivalent	Notes
1	European Union	36.0 million	39.44	Grant
2	African Development Bank		161.47	Loan
3	French Development Agency (AFD)	110.00 million	120.52	Loan
	Total		321.43 million	

== Construction timetable ==
According to reliable online sources, development of this renewable energy infrastructure project began on 1 April 2023 and is expected to reach commercial commissioning no later than 31 December 2028. The implementing agency is TANESCO, (Tanzania Electric Supply Company).

== Benefits ==
Among the benefits that are expected to accrue from the construction and operation of this dam are the provision of an estimated 524 GWh of clean electric energy annually, to the Tanzanian people, businesses and industry. This will mitigate the annual emission of an estimated 216,000 tons of carbon dioxide (CO_{2}). The power station is part o the Tanzanian government's goal to generate at least 5,000 MW of electricity by 2025. An estimated 1,000 people are expected to receive temporary jobs during the construction phase and another 100 individuals are expected to be employed on long-term contracts during the operational phase.

== See also ==
- Kagera Region
- List of power stations in Tanzania
