= Kikonge Hydroelectric Power Station =

Dam in Ruvuma Region, Tanzania

- Location in Tanzania Kikonge Hydroelectric Power Station (Africa) Kikonge Hydroelectric Power Station (Earth)
- Country: Tanzania
- Location: Ruvuma Region
- Coordinates: 10°30′29″S 34°43′46″E
- Purpose: Power, irrigation & flood control
- Status: Proposed
- Owner: TANESCO

Dam and spillways
- Impounds: Ruhuhu River
- Dam volume: 6,000,000,000 cubic metres (2.11888000329×10^{11} cu ft)

Power Station
- Commission date: 2025 (Expected)
- Installed capacity: 300 MW (400,000 hp)
- Website; Tanesco website

Kikonge Hydroelectric Power Station project is a proposed 300 MW (400,000 hp) hydroelectric dam in Ruvuma Region, Tanzania.

== Location ==
The power station and the associated dam and water reservoir would be located in the Kikonge area in the Ruvuma Region in south-western Tanzania. This is approximately 130 kilometres (81 mi), by road, north-west of Songea, the regional headquarters. This is about 625 kilometres (388 mi), by road, south-west of Dodoma, Tanzania's capital.

== Overview ==
In August 2016, the government of Tanzania secured partial funding from the African Development Bank for a pre-feasibility study for a dam across Ruhuhu River, with a reservoir of 6,000,000,000 cubic metres (2.11888000329×10^{11} cu ft) and capable of generating 300 MW (400,000 hp) of electricity. As part of the development, a high voltage transmission line, an irrigation scheme, and an agro-business development are also planned. The pre-feasibility study is expected to last 22 months and the power station, if developed, is expected online in 2025.

== See also ==
- List of hydropower stations in Africa
- List of power stations in Tanzania
