= Mtwara Thermal Power Station =

Power station in Tanzania

- Map of Tanzania showing the location of Mtwara Thermal Power Station
- Country: Tanzania
- Location: Mtwara, Tanzania
- Coordinates: 10°15′35″S 40°02′19″E
- Status: Operational
- Construction began: 2007
- Commission date: 2008
- Construction cost: US$13.5 million (2012)
- Owner: TANESCO
- Operator: TANESCO

Thermal power station
- Primary fuel: Natural gas

Power generation
- Nameplate capacity: 18 MW (24,000 hp)

External links
- Website: www.tanesco.co.tz

Mtwara Thermal Power Station is a power plant owned by the Tanzania Electric Supply Company. The station has a capacity of 18 MW (24,000 hp) and uses natural gas from the Mnazi Bay gas wells in Mtwara. The station is not connected to the national grid but is instead connected to the Mtwara/Lindi mini-grid.

== Location ==
The power station is located on the B2 Highway, from Mtwara to Mikindani, approximately 20 kilometres (12 mi) north-west of Mtwara. Mikindani is about equidistant between Mtwara and the station. The coordinates of the station are 10°15'35.0"S, 40°02'19.0"E (Latitude:-10.259732; Longitude:40.038604).

== History ==
The plant was first created by Wentworth Resources Limited in 2007 when Wentworth began building the Mnazi Bay gas fields. The company built a small 18 MW (24,000 hp) power plant to support their operations, with the surplus sold to the local community. Initially, the company posted a loss; however, by the end of 2011, they had managed to obtain their first profitable year. The company nevertheless decided to change its strategy within Tanzania and continue to focus their investment in gas exploration and drilling.

Wentworth Power Limited, the Wentworth subsidiary managing the operations, decided to sell all of its shares to the Tanzania Electric Supply Company for $13.5 million effective 7 February 2012. The gas supplied to the power plant, however, will still be supplied by Wentworth.

== See also ==
- List of power stations in Tanzania
- Economy of Tanzania
