= Tegeta Thermal Power Station =

Tanzania Electric Supply Company

- Map of Tanzania showing the location of Tegeta Thermal Power Station
- Country: Tanzania
- Location: Tegeta, Dar es Salaam
- Coordinates: 6°40′27″S 39°11′3.1″E
- Status: Operational
- Construction began: 2006
- Commission date: November 2009 (Natural Gas)
- Owner: TANESCO
- Operator: TANESCO

Thermal power station
- Primary fuel: Natural gas

Power generation
- Nameplate capacity: 45 MW

External links
- Website: www.tanesco.co.tz

Tegeta Thermal Power Station is a Tanzania Electric Supply Company owned power plant. The project began in 2006 half funded by the Tanzanian Government and the other half by The Government of the Kingdom of the Netherlands under ORET/MILIEV program.

The power-plant is located in Tegeta, Dar es Salaam and has an installed capacity of 45 megawatts (60,000 hp) using Natural Gas as fuel. The power plant obtains Natural gas from the existing dar-es-salaam gas pipeline.

== Operations ==
The Power plant operates on Natural gas bought from the national pipeline. ORCA Exploration Group Inc. was assigned the contract to provide the natural gas. Currently the government does not plan to expand this power plant due to limitations in the gas pipeline however TANESCO is expanding their gas generation capacity with their new Kinyerezi Power Plant.

== Confusion ==
In 2014 there was a Tegeta escrow scandal, that involved the embezzlement of around $250 million and $400 million. However, this was not the power station that was involved in the scandal, it was the power plant operated by Independent Power Tanzania Limited.

== See also ==
- Tanzania Electric Supply Company Limited (TANESCO)
- List of power stations in Tanzania
- Economy of Tanzania
