= Kinyerezi I Thermal Power Station =

Power station in Tanzania

- Location of Kinyerezi I Thermal Power Station
- Country: Tanzania
- Location: Kinyerezi Complex, Dar es Salaam, Tanzania
- Coordinates: 06°51′30″S 39°09′18″E
- Status: Operational
- Commission date: 31 March 2016
- Owner: Tanesco
- Operator: Tanesco

Thermal power station
- Primary fuel: Natural gas
- Secondary fuel: Jet Fuel

Power generation
- Nameplate capacity: 150 MW (200,000 hp)

External links
- Website: Tanesco website

Kinyerezi I Thermal Power Station, also Kinyerezi 1 Thermal Power Station or Kinyerezi 1 Gas Plant, is a 150 MW (200,000 hp), natural gas powered, electricity generating power station in Tanzania. It is located in the Kinyerezi Ward of Ilala District in Dar es Salaam and is owned and operated by the state-owned electricity company Tanesco.

== Location ==
The power-plant is located in Kinyerezi Ward, in Ilala District, in Dar es Salaam, the commercial capital and largest city in Tanzania. The plant lies adjacent to the 240 megawatts (320,000 hp) gas-fired power station, Kinyerezi II Thermal Power Station. The geographical coordinates of Kinyerezi 1 Power Station are: 06°51'30.0"S, 39°09'18.0"E (Latitude:-6.858333; Longitude:39.155000).

== Overview ==
Kinyerezi I Power Station is owned and operated by Tanesco, the Tanzanian electricity generation and distribution company. It was constructed by Jacobsen Elektro of Norway. The plant began producing 70 megawatts of electricity on 13 October 2015, and full production of 150 megawatts began on 31 March 2016. As of 6 April 2018, the power station had capacity of 150 megawatts (200,000 hp), with ongoing expansion to add another 185 megawatts (248,000 hp), to bring new capacity to 335 megawatts (449,000 hp), by February 2019. The power generated is evacuated via 220kV high-voltage cables to a nearby substation, where it is integrated into the Tanzanian national electricity grid. The power plant operates on either natural gas or jet fuel.

The power station has installed capacity of 150 megawatts, consisting two LM6000pf 40 megawatts turbines and two LM6000pf 35 megawatts turbines, all manufactured by General Electric of the United States.

== Future plans ==
While Kinyerezi I's capacity is being increased to 335 megawatts by February 2019, the government of Tanzania is also in process of expanding Kinyerezi II to the full 240 megawatts. There are other plans to build two new gas-fired plants; Kinyerezi III (600 megawatts) and Kinyerezi IV (450 megawatts), to bring total capacity at the Kinyerezi complex to 1,625 megawatts (2,179,000 hp).

== See also ==
- Tanzania Electric Supply Company Limited
- List of power stations in Tanzania
- Economy of Tanzania
