= Miombo Hewani Wind Power Station =

Wind farm in Tanzania

- Country: Tanzania
- Location: Makambako, Njombe Region
- Coordinates: 08°37′51″S 34°48′39″E
- Status: Proposed
- Construction began: 2018 Expected
- Commission date: 2024 Expected
- Owner: Windlab Developments Tanzania Limited

Power generation
- Nameplate capacity: 300 megawatts (400,000 hp)

Miombo Hewani Wind Power Station, also Miombo Hewani Wind Farm (meaning "rocks in the air" in Swahili), is a planned 300 megawatts (400,000 hp) wind-powered power station in the Njombe Region of Tanzania.

== Location ==
The power station would be located in the villages of Isimike, Igomba and Itengelo, in Sasa Ward, in Wanging'ombe District, Njombe Region, approximately 10 kilometres (6 mi), north of the town of Makambako, close to the tri-point area, where Njombe Region, Iringa Region and Mbeya Region meet.

== Overview ==
To help diversify Tanzania's electricity sources, Windlab Developments Tanzania Limited (WDTL), have proposed to establish Miombo Hewani Wind Farm, a 300 megawatt project, to be developed in phases. The development company, WDTL, is a subsidiary of Australia’s Windlab Limited of Australia, with developments in Australia, the United States and South Africa.

In May 2018, the developers of this wind farm were granted an electricity generation license for a power plant of up to 300 megawatts. The license is the first-ever for a grid-ready wind farm in the history of Tanzania. The wind farm has a planned lifespan of 25 years from completion.

== Development ==
It is expected that the first phase, consisting of 34 turbines, will generate 100 megawatts (130,000 hp) and cost US$300 million. A new transmission line will transmit the power to a substation in Makambako, where the energy will be integrated into the national electric grid. The power station is expected to power one million average-sized Tanzanian homes.

== Funding ==
This development has received partial funding from the Ministry for Foreign Affairs of Finland.

== See also ==
- List of power stations in Tanzania
