= Nyumba ya Mungu Dam =

Dam in Tanzania

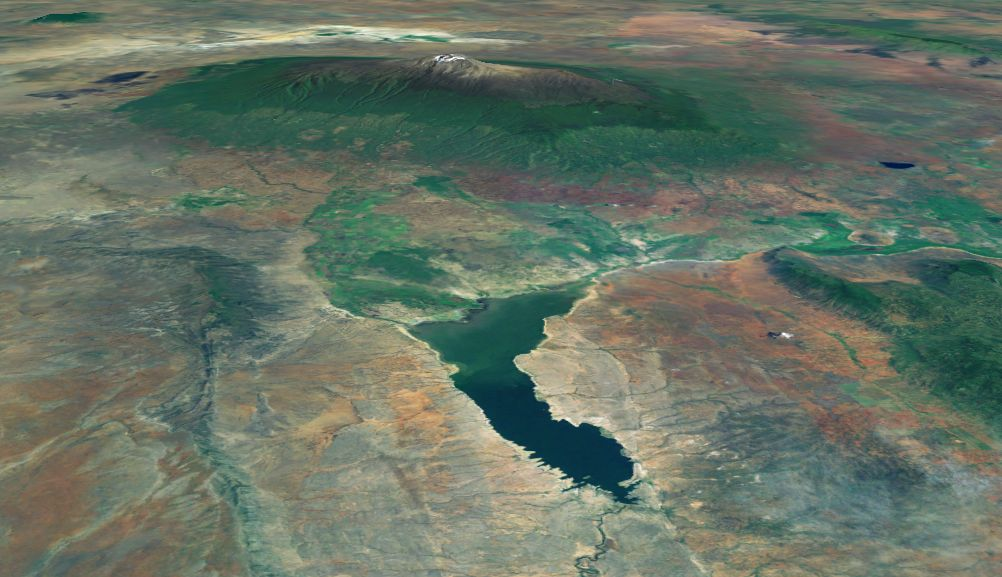
- The Nyumba ya Mungu Reservoir

- Map of Tanzania showing the location of Nyumba ya Mungu Dam
- Official name: Pangani Hydro Systems
- Location: Mwanga District, Kilimanjaro Region, Tanzania
- Coordinates: 03°49′33.0″S 37°28′9.6″E
- Construction began: 1967
- Opening date: 1969
- Owner: TANESCO

Dam and spillways
- Impounds: Pangani River
- Height: 43 m (141 ft)
- Spillway type: Earth and Rock Fill

Reservoir
- Total capacity: 600×10^{6} m^{3} (490,000 acre⋅ft)
- Catchment area: 7,668 km^{2} (2,961 sq mi)

Power Station
- Operator: Tanesco
- Commission date: 1969
- Turbines: 2x4
- Installed capacity: 8 MW (11,000 hp)
- Website; Tanesco website

Nyumba ya Mungu Dam is a Tanzanian, hydroelectric dam located in and operated in Mwanga District, Kilimanjaro Region. It was built in the late 1960s and is Kilimanjaro region's largest artificial water body. Nyumba ya Mungu Reservoir. The reservoir is shared with Moshi District of Kilimanjaro Region and Simanjiro District of Manyara Region. Nyumba ya Mungu means 'House of God'. Its installed capacity is 8 megawatts (11,000 hp).

== Overview ==
=== Reservoir ===
Nyumba ya Mungu is a man made lake in the Kilimanjaro region. The reservoir is situated in the Pangani River Valley of the Masai Steppe, about 50 km south of Moshi. It is fed by two major inflows, the rivers Kikuletwa and Ruvu which drain some 7,500 square kilometres (2,900 sq mi) of catchment consisting of wooded grassland, forest, true desert, and alpine desert.

It was constructed for the purposes of irrigation, hydro-electric power and to start a local fishing industry. The reservoir was completed in December 1965 however the irrigation scheme had not yet been developed. The plan was to build a dam that would have served the purpose of storing flood flow, which would allow the development of some 30,000 acres of irrigated farming and generation of electricity power.

By 1970 the lake had a thriving Tilapia fishery production. However, this did not last long and subsequent reports from 1972 and 1973 showed a major decline in fish product.

== See also ==
- Tanzania Electric Supply Company
- List of power stations in Tanzania
