= Pangani Falls Dam =

Dam in Muheza, Ranga, Tanzania

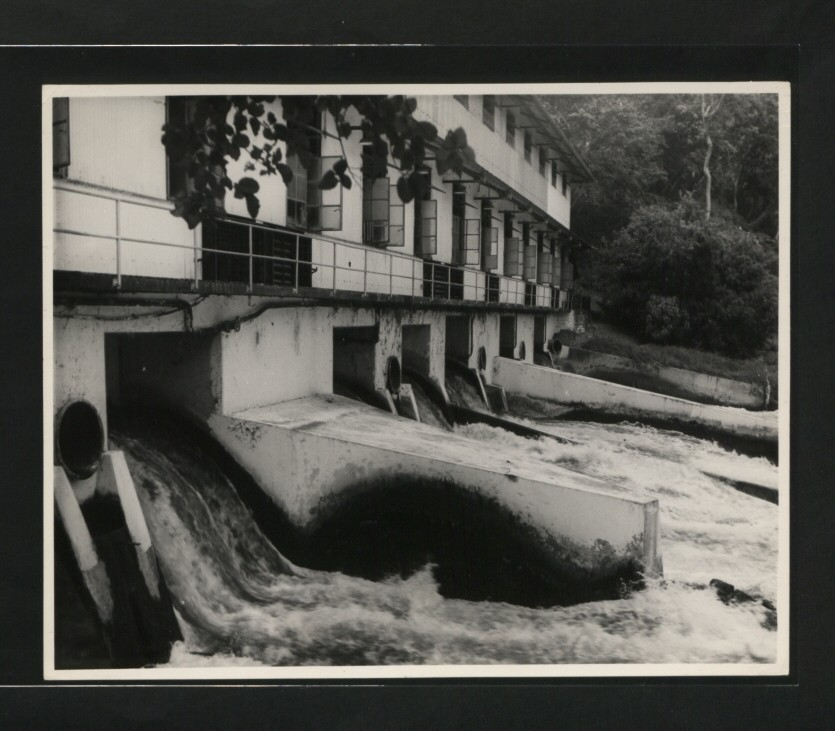

- Map of Tanzania showing the location of Pangani Falls Dam
- Official name: Pangani Hydro Systems
- Location: Muheza District, Tanga, Tanzania
- Coordinates: 05°20′56.6″S 38°39′01.1″E
- Construction began: 1991
- Opening date: 1994
- Construction cost: $126 million (1995)
- Owner: TANESCO

Dam and spillways
- Impounds: Pangani River
- Height: 10
- Spillway type: Earth and Rock Fill
- Spillway capacity: 47,000 m^{3} (38 acre⋅ft)

Reservoir
- Total capacity: 0.8×10^{6} m^{3} (650 acre⋅ft)
- Catchment area: 42,200 km^{2} (16,300 sq mi)

Power Station
- Operator: Tanesco
- Commission date: 1994
- Turbines: 2x34
- Installed capacity: 68 MW (91,000 hp)
- Website; Tanesco website

Pangani Falls Dam is a dam in Tanzania, which is part of the Pangani Hydro Systems. The dam is located at Koani in the Muheza District of the Tanga Region, about 8 km (5.0 mi) south of another power station at Hale. The Pangani falls power station has two turbines and has an installed capacity of 68 megawatts (91,000 hp).

== Overview ==
Construction of the dam began in December 1991 and was commissioned quickly just three years later to aid the ailing power shortages in the country. The entire project was funded by European Scandinavian nations (Norway, Finland and Sweden), which jointly decided to finance the Pangani Falls Redevelopment Project in 1989.

The project cost a total of US$126 million and was funded by three financiers: NORAD of Norway (42%); FINNIDA of Finland (33%) and SIDA of Sweden (25%).

== See also ==
- Tanesco
- List of power stations in Tanzania
