= Mtera Dam =

Dam in Tanzania

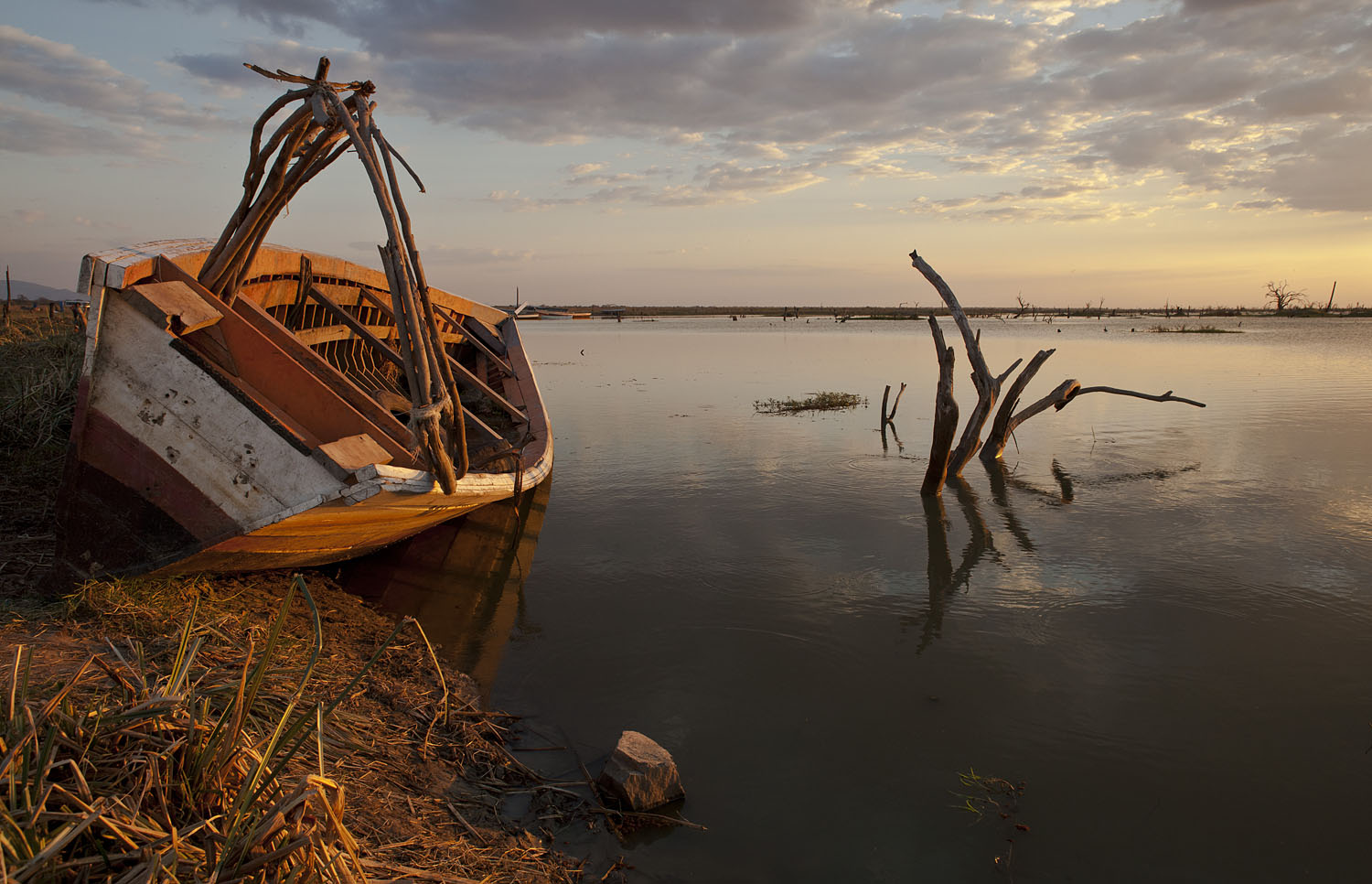
- The Mtera Reservoir in the year 2012.

- Location in Tanzania Mtera Dam (Africa) Mtera Dam (Earth)
- Official name: Bwawa la Mtera (Swahili)
- Country: Tanzania
- Coordinates: 7°08′10.3″S 35°59′12.6″E
- Purpose: Flood control and power
- Status: Operational
- Construction began: 1970
- Opening date: 19 February 1981
- Owner: TANESCO

Dam and spillways
- Type of dam: Rock-fill dam
- Impounds: Great Ruaha River
- Height: 40 metres (130 ft)
- Elevation at crest: 701.5 metres (2,302 ft)

Reservoir
- Catchment area: 68,000 km^{2} (26,000 sq mi)

Power Station
- Commission date: 1984
- Turbines: 2× 40 MW
- Installed capacity: 80 MW
- Website; Tanesco website

Mtera Dam is a hydroelectric dam in Tanzania. The dam is located midway between Iringa and Dodoma on the border between the Iringa Region and the Dodoma Region. The travel time from Dodoma is about two hours on a tarmac road.

== Overview ==
Mtera Dam is a large hydroelectric dam in Tanzania. It measures 660 square kilometres (250 sq mi) at full capacity. The lake is 56 kilometres (35 mi) long, and 15 kilometres (9.3 mi) wide, and is feed by the Great Ruaha River and the Kisigo River. It was built from 1975 to 1979 for the purpose of regulating water level at the downstream at the Ruaha installed Kidatu Hydro-electric Dam. It has a capacity of 80 megawatts (110,000 hp).

== Ecology ==
The lake is considered to be one of the best places in Tanzania to observe birds, since there are approximately one million dead trees in it and it has many shallow areas. In addition, the waters are rich in fish. In the early 1990s about 5000 tonnes of fish were caught in the lake.

== See also ==
- List of hydropower stations in Africa
- List of power stations in Tanzania
