= Mwenga Power Station =

Dam in Mufindi, Iringa, Tanzania

Mwenga Dam
- Map of Tanzania showing the location of Mwenga Dam
- Official name: Mwenga Power Station
- Location: Mufindi District, Iringa
- Coordinates: 08°37′19.9″S 35°41′29″E
- Opening date: 2012
- Owner: Rift Valley Energy

Power Station
- Operator: Mwenga Hydro Limited
- Commission date: 2012
- Installed capacity: 4 MW (5,400 hp)
- Annual generation: 24 GWh (86 TJ)
- Website; Rift Valley Energy website

Mwenga Dam is a hydroelectric dam in Tanzania, located in the Iringa Region. Its installed capacity is 4 megawatts (5,400 hp). The Power plant is operated by an Independent Power Producer, Rift Valley Energy.

== History ==
The power plant is part of the Mwenga Hydro and Rural Electrification Project Mini Grid. The plant was built to supply electricity to the Mufundi Tea Plantations and was built approximately 50km from the factory. Along the transmission line route there were 17 un-electrified villages. Rift valley energy decided to connect this villages and provide electricity to these villages.

The company received support from the ACP-EU Energy Facility and the Tanzania Rural Energy Agency, and in 2012 launched their 4MW Hydro plant and mini-grid. As of 2020, the company supplies energy to the Tea Factory as well as to 32 villages in the Mufindi district servicing 4800 customers.

Rift Valley Energy operates its power distribution services through Mwenga Power Services Ltd.

== Challenges ==
The plants sells its excess electricity capacity to the national grid to Tanesco, however, has faced poor payment from the state company. As of September 2016, TANESCO owed the plant operator $1.3 million for electricity supplied.

== See also ==
- Tanesco
