= Ruhuhu River =

River in Tanzania

Coordinates: 10°31′S 34°34′E

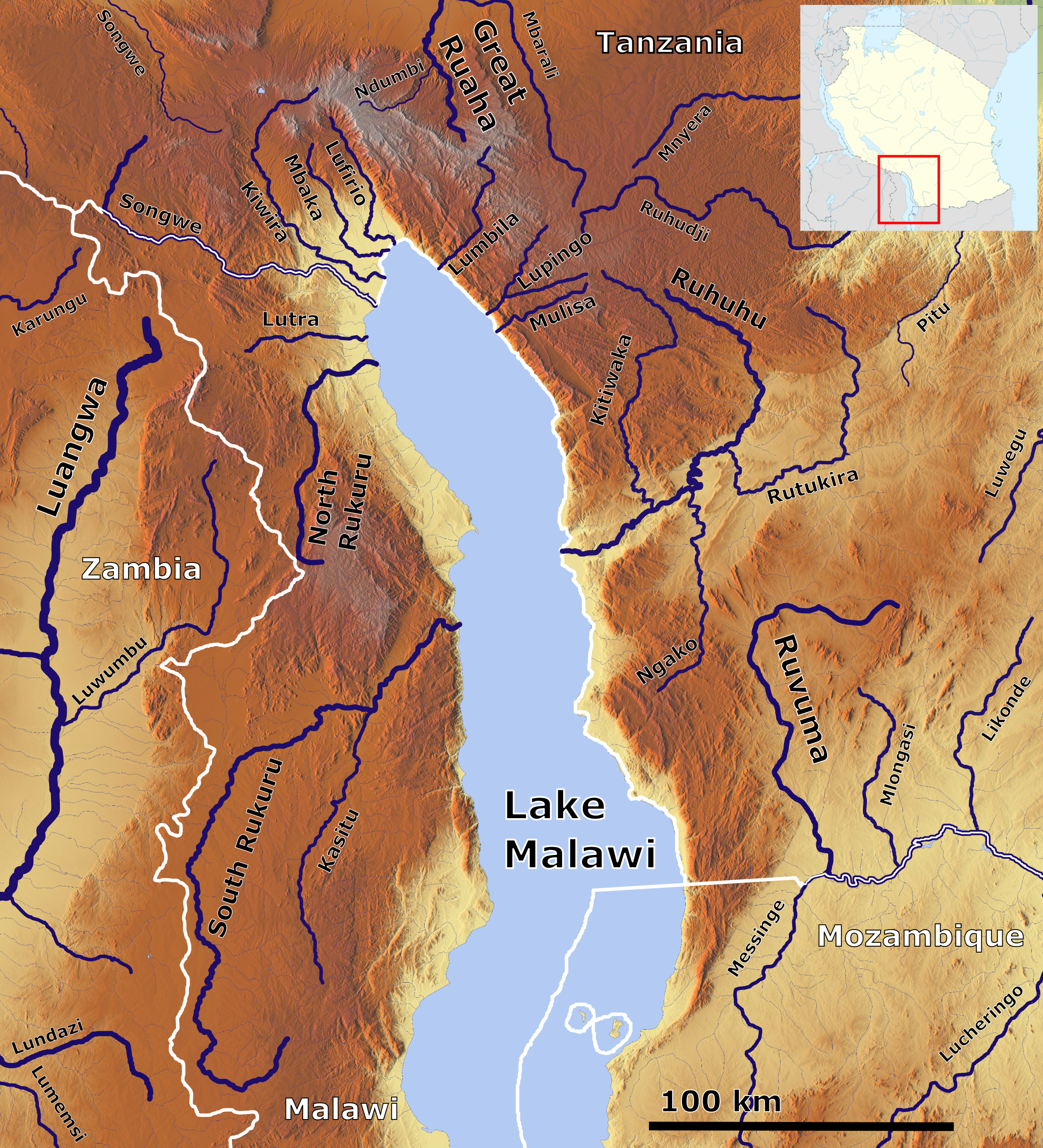
The Ruhuhu (right center)

The Ruhuhu River is a river in Ruvuma Region, Tanzania.

== Geography ==
The source of the Ruhuhu is on the eastern slope of the Kipengere Range (Livingstone Mountains) in Tanzania, where it first flows southeast and then turns west to Lake Malawi. It is over 300 km (190 mi) long, of which the last 100 km (62 mi) is a single deep gorge. The river's mouth is just south of Manda.

== Catchment area ==
At over 14,000 km^{2} (5,400 sq mi) (between 14,070–14,200 km^{2} (5,430–5,480 sq mi)) depending on the data source), the Ruhuhu River Basin is the largest of the Malawiese River Basins and the largest in Tanzania. As the longest river flowing into Lake Malawi, by convention it is the headwaters of the Shire, which drains the lake. The Ruhuhu carries water all year round.

== Hydrometry ==
The discharge of the Ruhuhu was measured in m^{3}/s for 43 years (1971-2015) at the Kikonge gauge, about 20 km (12 mi) upstream of the mouth. However the values in other sources are higher by a factor of about four.

The Tanzanian government decided in 2016 to install a hydroelectric power station with an expected capacity of 300 MW (400,000 hp) (Kikonge Hydroelectric Power Station) at this location.
