= Kidatu Dam =

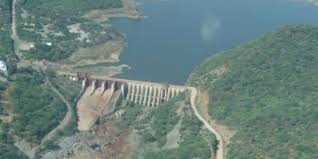

- Location in Tanzania Kidatu Dam (Africa) Kidatu Dam (Tanzania)
- Official name: Bwawa la Kidatu (Swahili)
- Country: Tanzania
- Location: Kilosa, Morogoro Region
- Coordinates: 07°38′09″S 36°53′12″E
- Purpose: Power
- Status: Operational
- Construction began: 1970s
- Opening date: 1975
- Construction cost: $102 million (Phase I)
- Owner: TANESCO

Dam and spillways
- Type of dam: Rock-fill dam
- Impounds: Great Ruaha River
- Height: 40 metres (130 ft)
- Dam volume: 800,000 m^{3} (28,000,000 cu ft)
- Spillway capacity: 6,000 m^{3}/s (210,000 cu ft/s)

Reservoir
- Catchment area: 10 km^{2} (3.9 sq mi)

Kidatu Power Station
- Commission date: 1975
- Turbines: 4 × 51 MW
- Installed capacity: 204 megawatts (274,000 hp)
- Website; Tanesco website

Kidatu Dam, also Kidadu Hydroelectric Power Station, is a 204 megawatts (274,000 hp) hydroelectric dam located in Kilosa District of Morogoro Region in Tanzania.

== Location ==
The power station is located across the Great Ruaha River, in the village of Kilosa, in Morogoro Region, approximately 337 kilometres (209 mi), by road, southwest of Dar es Salaam, the commercial capital and largest city of Tanzania. This is about 5.5 kilometres (3 mi), by road, northeast of Kidatu, the nearest urban center. The coordinates of Kidatu Power Station are:7°39'47.0"S, 36°58'39.0"E (Latitude:-7.663056; Longitude:36.977500).

== Overview ==
The Kidatu power plant was built in two phases under the name of Great Ruaha Power Project in the 1970s for phase one and 1980s for phase two. Phase I was completed in 1975 starting with the construction of an earth-rock fill dam, a generating capacity of 2 x 51 MW, and 220 kV transmission line to Dar es Salaam via Morogoro. Phase II, completed in 1980, involved two more 51 MW generators, and construction of a bigger storage dam (Mtera Dam) with a capacity of 3,200 million cubic metres (2,600,000 acre⋅ft).

The plant has undergone two major rehabilitation works. Phase I covered repairs to turbines one and two, replacement of excitation equipment and repair of a damaged generator unit. These works were executed from 1993 to 1994. The second rehabilitation commenced in 1999. Major works were computerizing the control and protection system, repair to turbines, replacement of runners on units 1 and 2, generators and water ways. The project was financed by SIDA, NORAD and Tanesco at the estimated cost of about US$12 million.

In 2017, repairs were carried out on one of the 51 megawatts units which had failed. The work was carried out by engineers and technicians from the Croatian manufactures of the turbines, and personnel from Tanesco, the national electricity generation monopoly. The next major maintenance on the power station, is planned for 2020.

== See also ==
- List of power stations in Tanzania

== Sources ==
- Öhman, May-Britt, Taming Exotic Beauties: Swedish Hydro Power Constructions in Tanzania in the Era of Development Assistance, 1960s - 1990s, Stockholm, 2007, PhD Thesis, http://www.diva-portal.org/smash/record.jsf?pid=diva2:12267
