= Selous Game Reserve =

World Heritage Site in Tanzania, East Africa

- IUCN category IV (habitat/species management area)
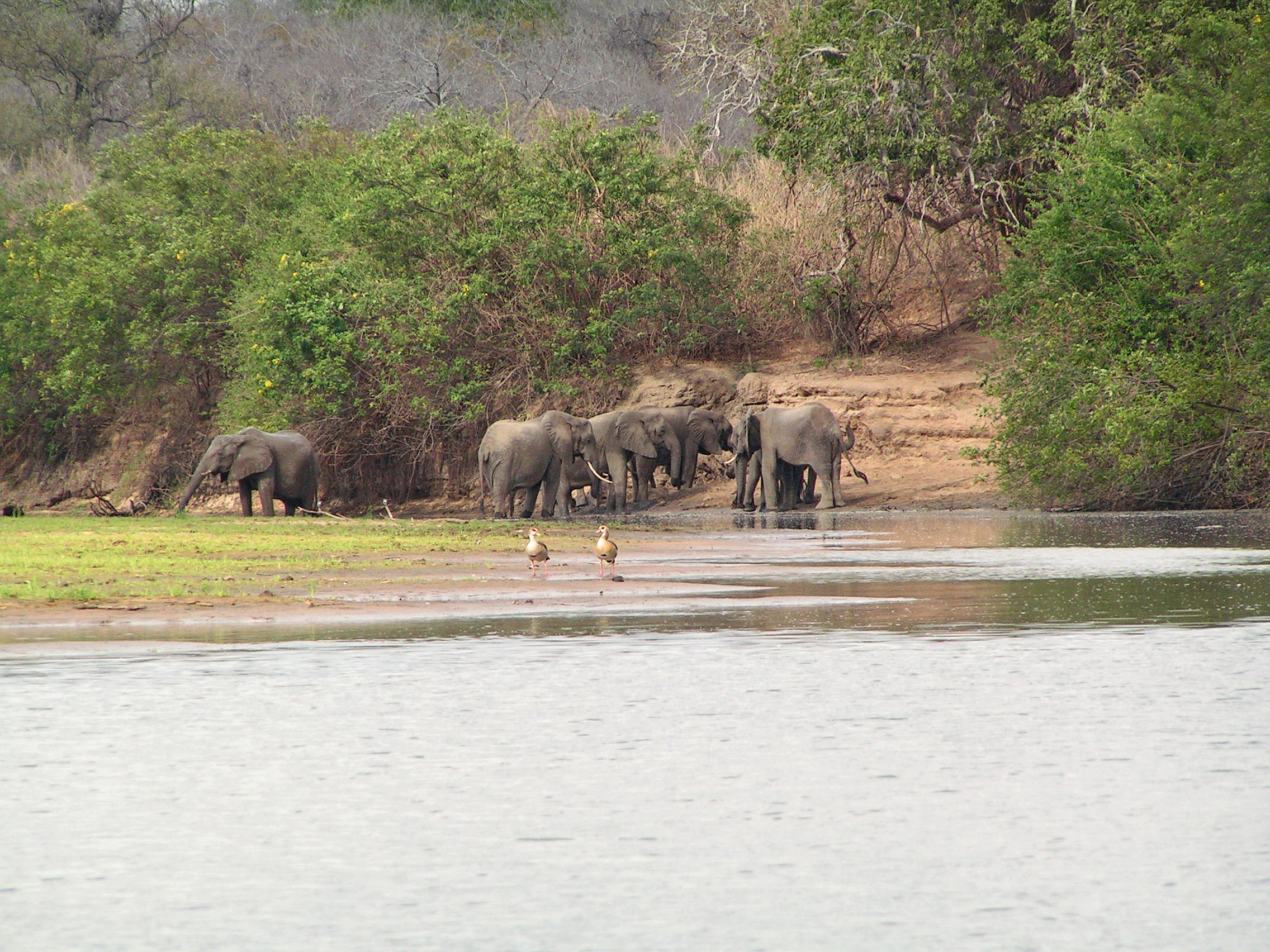
- Elephants in the Selous Game Reserve

- Location within Tanzania
- Location: Tanzania
- Coordinates: 9°0′S 37°24′E
- Area: 54,600 km^{2} (21,100 sq mi)
- Established: 1922

UNESCO World Heritage Site
- Type: Natural
- Criteria: ix, x
- Designated: 1982 (6th session)
- Reference no.: 199bis
- Region: Africa
- Endangered: 2014-present

The Selous Game Reserve, now renamed as Nyerere National Park (in-part), is a protected nature reserve and wilderness area in southern Tanzania, East Africa. It covers a total area of 50,000 km^{2} (19,000 sq mi), with additional buffer zones, as well. It was designated a UNESCO World Heritage Site in 1982, owing to its high levels of biodiversity and vast, undisturbed natural landscapes, such as the grasslands and the miombo woodlands habitat. Among the numerous species within the park are some of the continent's largest and most iconic (and most vulnerable, threatened or endangered), such as the bush elephant, black rhinoceros, hippopotamus, lion, leopard, spotted hyena, painted dog, Cape buffalo, Masai giraffe, plains zebra, white-bearded gnu and the giant Nile crocodile. Due to the fragility and sensitivity of the many species and ecosystems within the park, human habitation is not permitted within its bounds, and all persons entering and exiting are tallied and tracked by the Wildlife Division of the Tanzanian Ministry of Natural Resources and Tourism.

== History ==
The area was first designated a protected area in 1896 by the German Governor of Tanganyika Hermann von Wissmann, and became a hunting reserve in 1905. The reserve was named after Frederick Selous, a famous big game hunter and early conservationist, who died at Beho Beho in this territory in 1917 while fighting against the Germans during World War I. Scottish explorer and cartographer Keith Johnston had died at Beho Beho in 1879 while leading a Royal Geographical Society expedition to the Great Lakes of Africa with Joseph Thomson.

Since 2005, the protected area is considered a Lion Conservation Unit.

A boundary change to allow the use of uranium deposits has been approved. The approval for the boundary change was given by the UNESCO and seriously criticized by environmentalists and organizations e.g., Uranium-Network and Rainforest Rescue.

Tanzania president John Magufuli has given an approval of constructing a new Stiegler's Gorge Hydroelectric Power Station of 2,115MW over the Rufiji River. The power station will result to an additional 2,100 megawatts of electricity, more than tripling Tanzania's installed hydropower capacity of 562 megawatts. The project started on 26 July 2019 and should be completed by 2022. The International Union for Conservation of Nature (IUCN) has criticised the Government of Tanzania for failing to consider, the impact of the flooding of nearly 1,000 km2 will have, on both the people and biodiversity of the reserve. Thousands of people are dependent on the river for fishing and agriculture. Portions of the Selous may be regarded as untouched wilderness. The Germans never mapped the Rufiji Floodplain, and in 1917, an expedition headed by Lt. E. William Boville described that area as "uninhabitable".

== Description ==
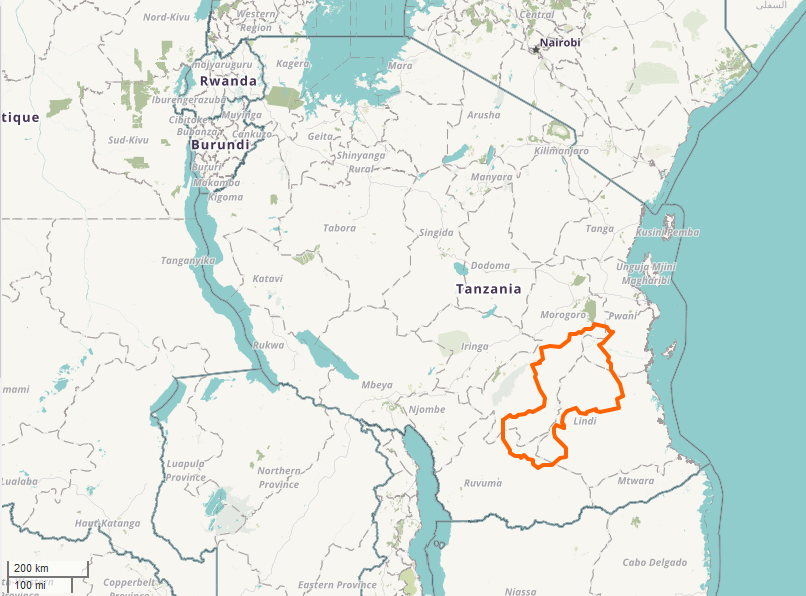
Location within Tanzania

Interesting sites in the park include the Rufiji River, which flows into the Indian Ocean opposite Mafia Island, and Stiegler Gorge, a canyon measuring nearly 100 metres deep by as wide. Varied habitats include grassland, typical Acacia savanna, wetlands, riverine and riparian zones, and extensive miombo woodlands. Although total wildlife populations are high, the reserve is vast; densities of observable animals may be lower than in the busier parks in Tanzania's northern tourist circuit (such as the Serengeti). In 1976, the Selous Game Reserve contained about 109,000 elephants, then the largest population in the world; by 2013, that number had dropped to about 13,000 animals, including a sharp 66% drop just between 2009 and 2013 (an approx. 10-11% decrease per year for those six years). Many sources blame corrupt politicians, officials and businessmen who aid illegal hunters and poachers.

Most of the reserve remains set aside for game hunting solely through a number of privately leased hunting outfitters, but a section of the northern park along the Rufiji River has been designated a strict photographic wildlife zone and is a more popular tourist area. There are several high-end lodges and camps for visitors situated along the river and lake systems; somewhat difficult to access by road, most visitors arrive by small aircraft from Dar es Salaam, though train and car arrival is also possible. Walking safaris are offered in the Selous (something not every park allows), and boat trips on the Rufiji are another popular activity.

== Literature ==
- Peter Matthiessen and Hugo van Lawick (Photography): Sand Rivers. Aurum Press, London 1981, ISBN 0-906053-22-6.
- Robert J. Ross, The Selous in Africa: A Long Way from Anywhere, Officina Libraria, Milan 2015, 2016 (2nd. ed.), ISBN 9788897737643
- Rolf D. Baldus: Wild Heart of Africa. Rowland Ward Publications, Johannesburg 2009, ISBN 9780980262674
