= Rufiji River =

Largest and longest river in Tanzania

Rufiji
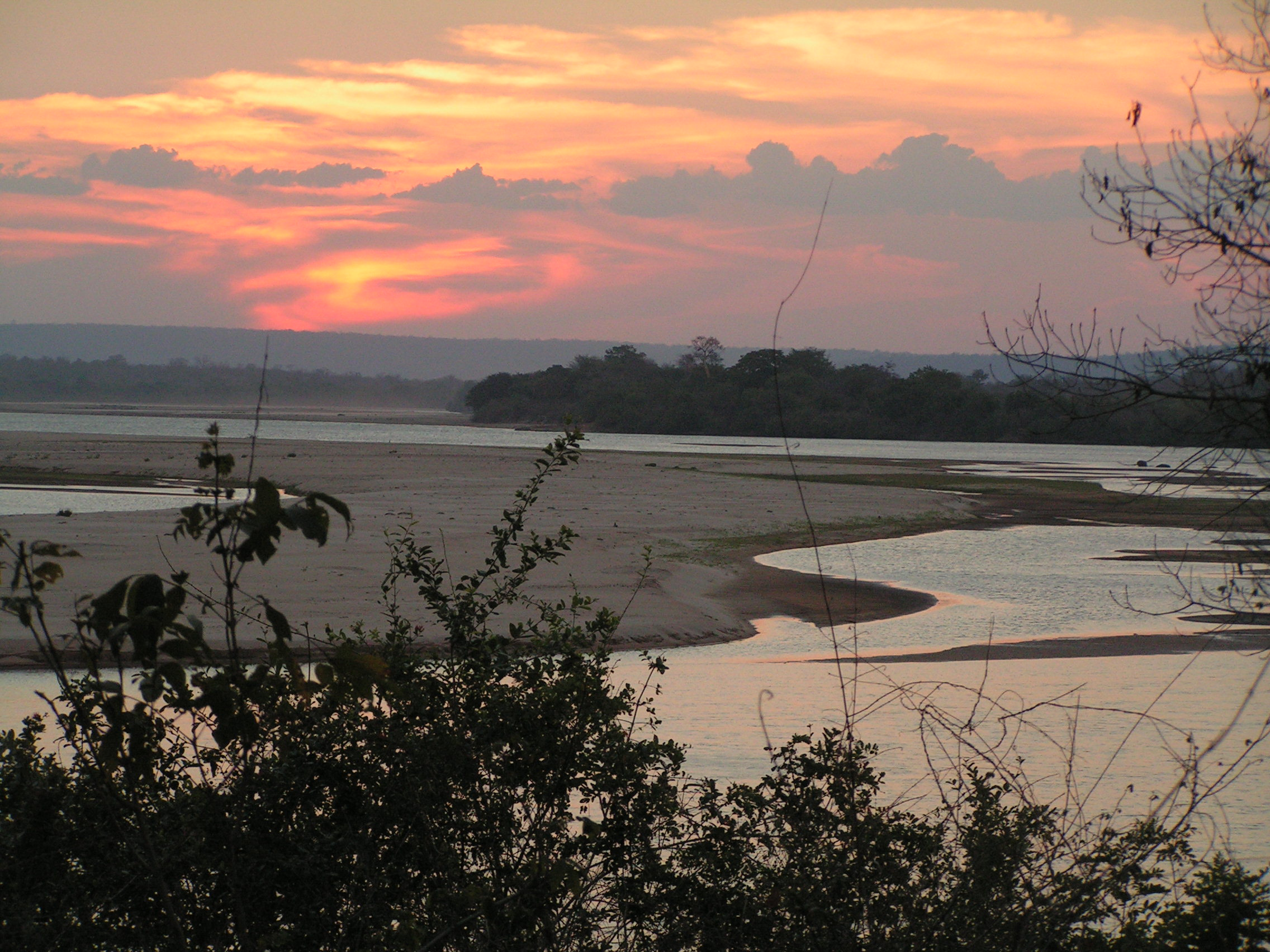
- Rufiji river in Selous

- Map of the Rufiji River drainage basin. The separate, endorheic Lake Sulunga basin is shown in green.

Location
- Country: Tanzania
- Region: Pwani Region
- Region: Morogoro Region
- Region: Iringa Region

Physical characteristics
- Source: Great Ruaha River
  - location: Tanzania
- 2nd source: Kilombero River
  - location: Morogoro Region
- 3rd source: Luwegu River
  - location: Morogoro Region
- Mouth: Indian Ocean
  - location: Pwani Region
  - coordinates: 7°46′26″S 39°21′50″E
- Length: 600 km (370 mi)
- Basin size: 177,429 square kilometres (68,506 sq mi)

The Rufiji River lies entirely within Tanzania. It is largest and longest river in the country, formed by the confluence of the Kilombero and the Luwegu river. It is approximately 600 kilometres (370 mi) long, with a source in southwestern Tanzania, terminating at the Indian Ocean, opposite Mafia Island, in Pwani Region. Its principal tributary is the Great Ruaha River. It is navigable for approximately 100 kilometres (62 mi).

The Rufiji river is approximately 200 kilometres (120 mi) south of Dar es Salaam. The river's delta contains the largest mangrove forest in eastern Africa.

== History ==
A branch of ancient sea routes led down the East African coast called "Azania" by the Greeks and Romans in the 1st century CE as described in the Periplus of the Erythraean Sea (and, very probably, Chinese: 澤散 in the 3rd century by the Chinese), at least as far as the port known to the Romans as Rhapta, which was probably located in the delta of the Rufiji River in modern Tanzania.

During the First World War, from October 1914 to July 1915, the river delta was the scene of a protracted naval operation. These were the attempts, and later achievement, by the Royal Navy to neutralize and destroy the German cruiser Königsberg.

== Basin ==
The catchment basin for the Rufiji River complex is 177,429 square kilometres (68,506 sq mi).

Rufiji Basin catchment area
River	Area km^{2}	Percentage of area	Percentage of run-off
Great Ruaha	83,970	47	15
Kilombero	39,990	23	62
Luwegu	26,300	15	18
Rufiji (lower river)	27,160	15	5
Total	177,429	100	100

== Hydroelectric Project ==
Tanzania president John Magufuli has approved the construction of a controversial new dam and power station on the river at Stiegler's Gorge. The power station is expected to provide 2,100 megawatts of electricity, more than triple Tanzania's existing hydropower of 562 megawatts. Construction of the dam started on July 26, 2019, and it is expected be ready by 2022.

Yet no update has been made in four years?

== Gallery ==
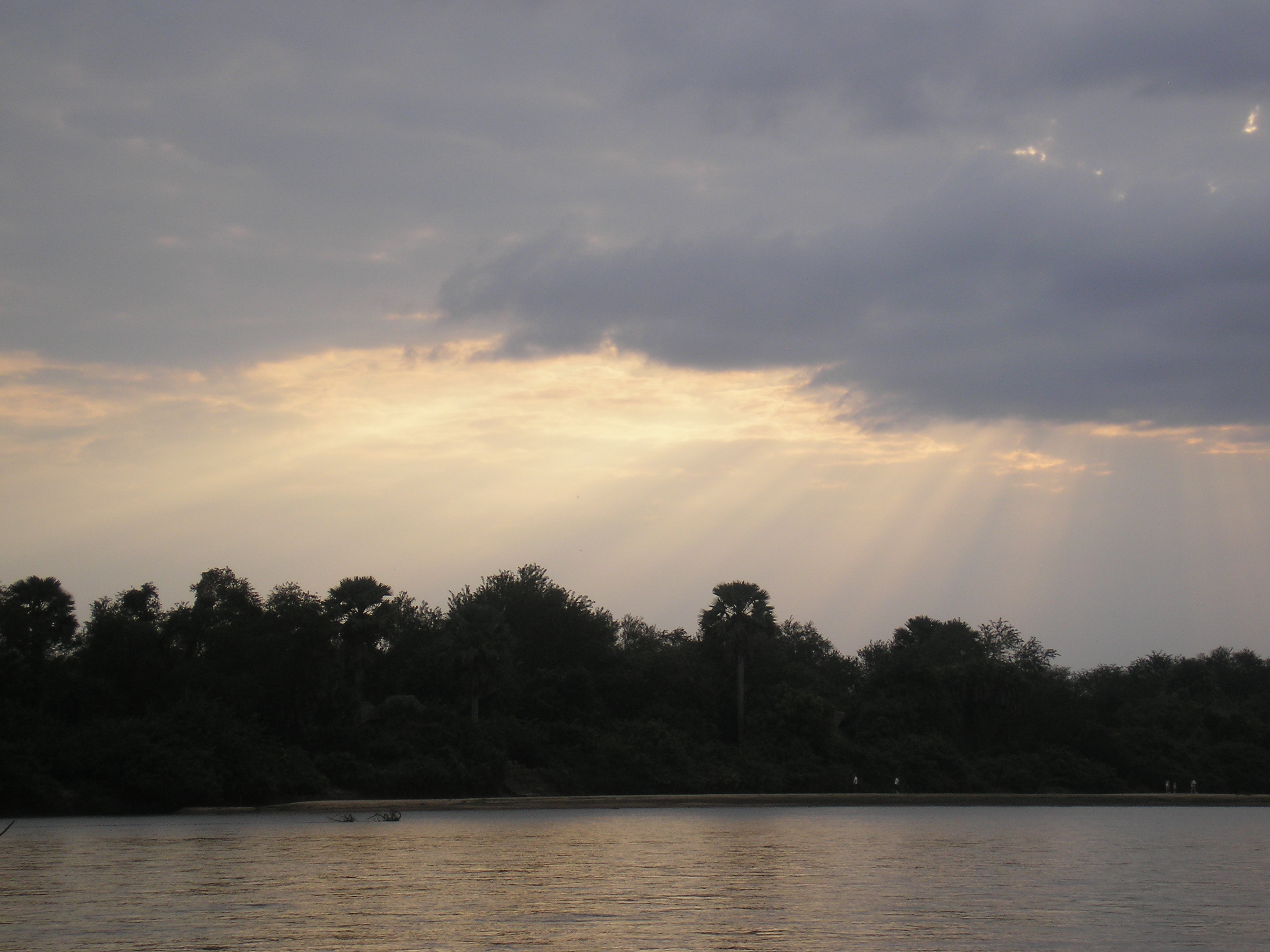
Sun poking through the clouds along the river.

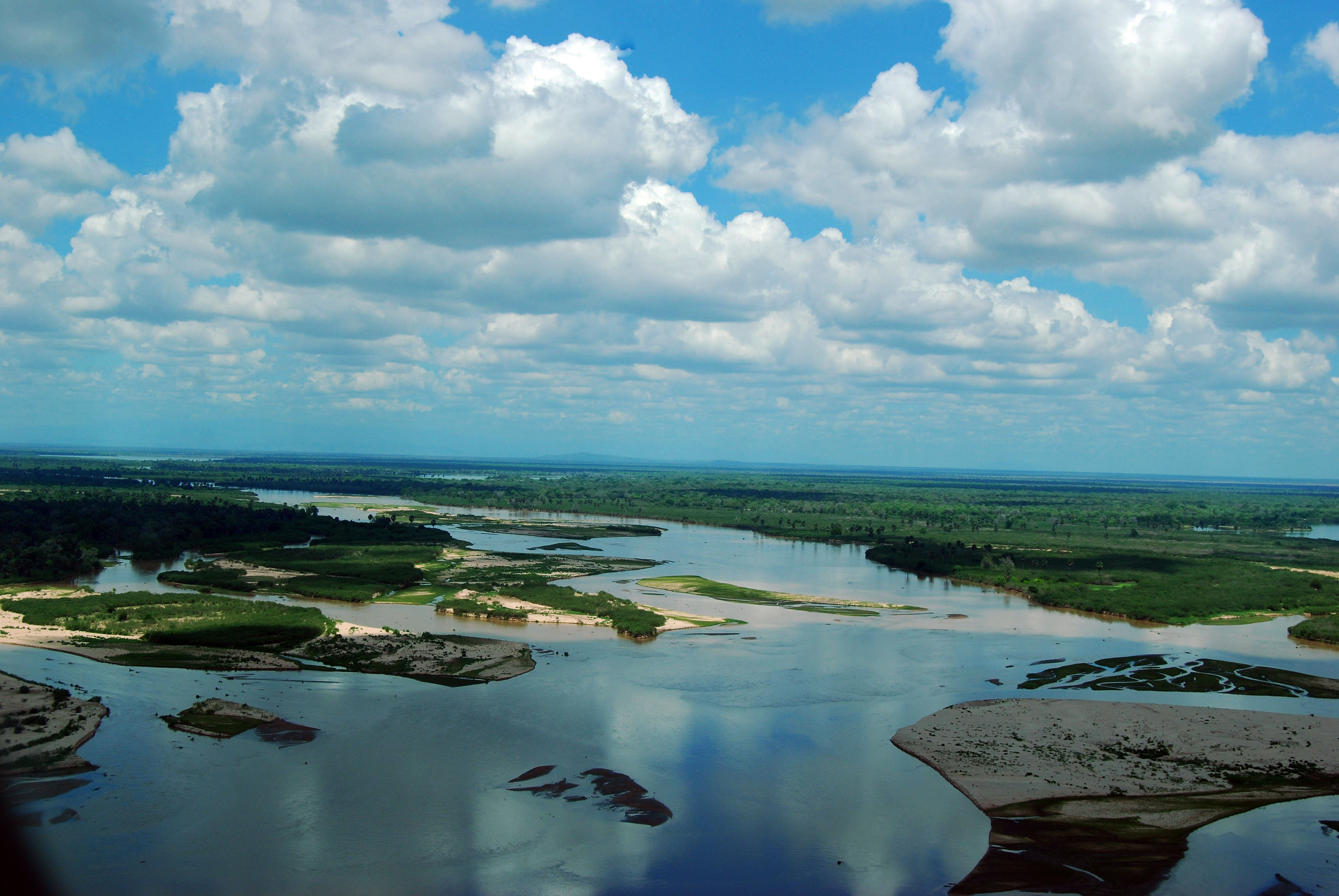
Rufiji River at Selous Game Reserve.

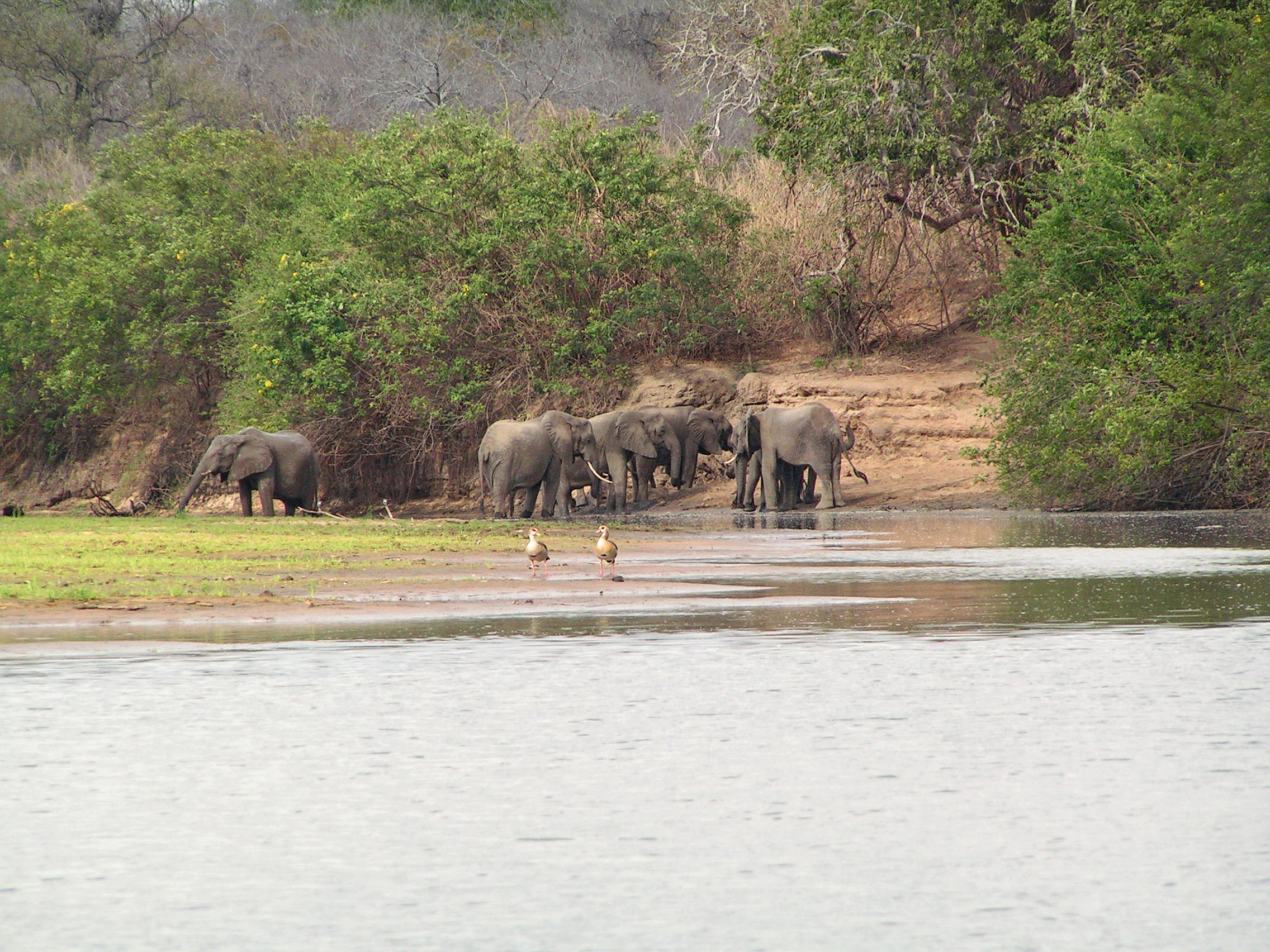
Elephants along the river.

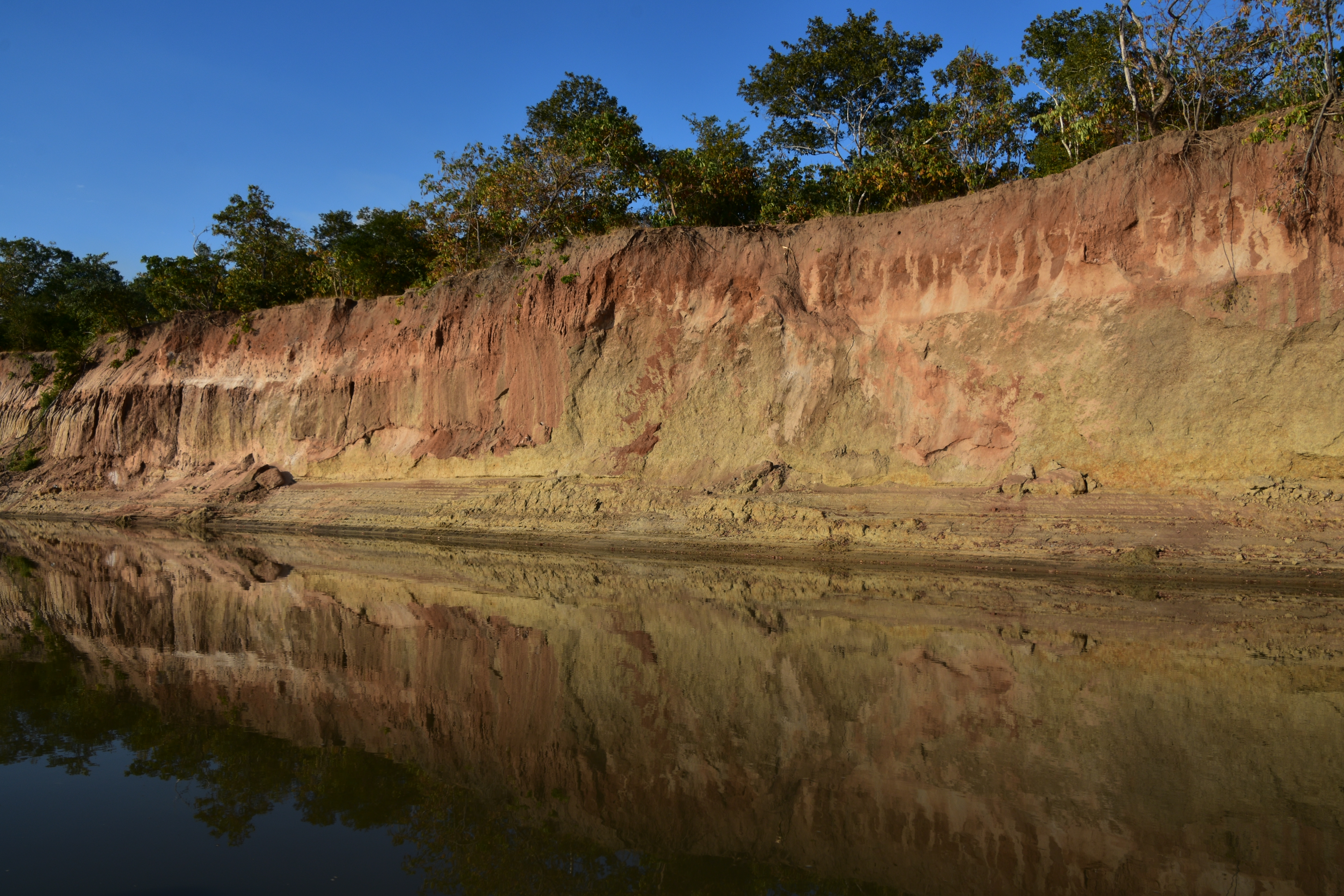
The river bank

== Ecological importance ==
The Rufiji River is Tanzania's largest river by catchment area and forms the extensive Rufiji Delta before entering the Indian Ocean. The delta contains one of the largest continuous mangrove forests in eastern Africa and provides habitat for numerous fish, bird, reptile, and mammal species.

The river delivers freshwater, sediments, and nutrients that sustain coastal fisheries and mangrove ecosystems. Seasonal flooding also supports floodplain agriculture and replenishes wetlands throughout the lower basin.

Recent hydropower development in the upper Rufiji basin, including the Julius Nyerere Hydropower Project, has generated discussion regarding potential impacts on downstream flow regimes, sediment transport, biodiversity, and the ecological integrity of the Rufiji Delta.
