= TANESCO =

Tanzanian electric company

Tanzania Electric Supply Company Limited
- Type: Public utility
- Industry: Energy
- Predecessor: Tanganyika Electric Supply Company Ltd. Dar es Salaam and District Electric Supply Company Ltd
- Founded: 1964
- Headquarters: Plot No. 114, Block G Dar es Salaam Road, Dodoma, Tanzania
- Area served: Tanzania Mainland, Zanzibar
- Key people: Engineer Gissima Nyamo-Hanga (MD)
- Products: Electricity
- Services: Electricity Generation, Electricity transmission, Electricity Distribution
- Revenue: ▲TSh 2,282 billion (FY 2022)
- Net income: ▲TSh 109.4 billion (FY 2022)
- Total assets: ▲TSh 19,572 billion (FY 2022)
- Total equity: ▲TSh 3,922 billion (FY 2022)
- Owner: Tanzanian Government (100%)
- Number of employees: 10,320
- Website: Tanesco website

The Tanzania Electric Supply Company Limited (TANESCO) is a Tanzanian parastatal organisation established in 1964. It is wholly owned by the government of Tanzania. The Ministry of Energy and Minerals regulates the operations of TANESCO.

Its business include: electricity generation, electricity transmission, electricity distribution and sale of electricity to the Tanzanian mainland and bulk power supply to the island of Zanzibar.

The company has a workforce of 7,300 persons. Its main offices are located in Ubungo west of Dar es Salaam central business district and it operates regional offices throughout Tanzania.

== History ==
=== Predecessor ===
Electricity was first introduced in Tanzania (Tanganyika) in 1908 by the German colonial authorities in Dar-es-salaam. After the British mandate was established a Government electricity department was formed and took over energy generation and transmission in the colony. In 1931 electricity was handed to two private companies, Tanganyika Electric Supply Company Ltd. (Tanesco) and Dar es Salaam and District Electric Supply Company Ltd (Danesco).

Commercial operations for Tanesco began in 1933 with the first diesel generator in the Tanga Region. The first dam was completed in 1936 on the Pangani River. By 1959 the total capacity was 17.5 MW and the company had 400 km of supply lines. On 12 February 1948 Tanesco secured the contract to sell surplus power from the hydro dam to Mombasa.

=== Post independence ===
At independence (1961) the government acquired some shares from both of the utilities. However, with Tanzania's economic policy shifting towards Ujamaa, by 1975 the government acquired all the shares and merged the two utilities to form a state own utility called the Tanzania Electric Supply Company Ltd. From 1975 the firm responsible for generating, transmitting and distributing power on the mainland. Furthermore, Tanesco is also responsible in selling bulk electricity to Zanzibar based ZECO Electric Company.

=== Reform ===
The government liberalised private sector investment in electricity generation in 1992. In 2002 as part of the Companies Act, 2002 of Tanzania, Tanesco was incorporated as a limited liability company; however all its shares were still held by the government. Due to the high dependence on Hydroelectric dams and poor hydrology between 2005 and 2008, Tanesco lead to the procurement of their first Emergency Power Project (EPP). The first EPP was the expansion of the Ubungo Power Station with Songas. From 2011 to 2013 TANESCO experienced a shortage of power generation due to poor hydrology and again procurement of costly EPPs was then undertaken. By the end of 2016, TANESCO sought an increase by 8.53 percent of the energy tariff, due to its difficult financial situation. In 2017, The president John Magufuli, dismissed the raise firing the director manager of TANESCO Felchesmi Mramba.

== Corporate affairs ==
=== Management ===
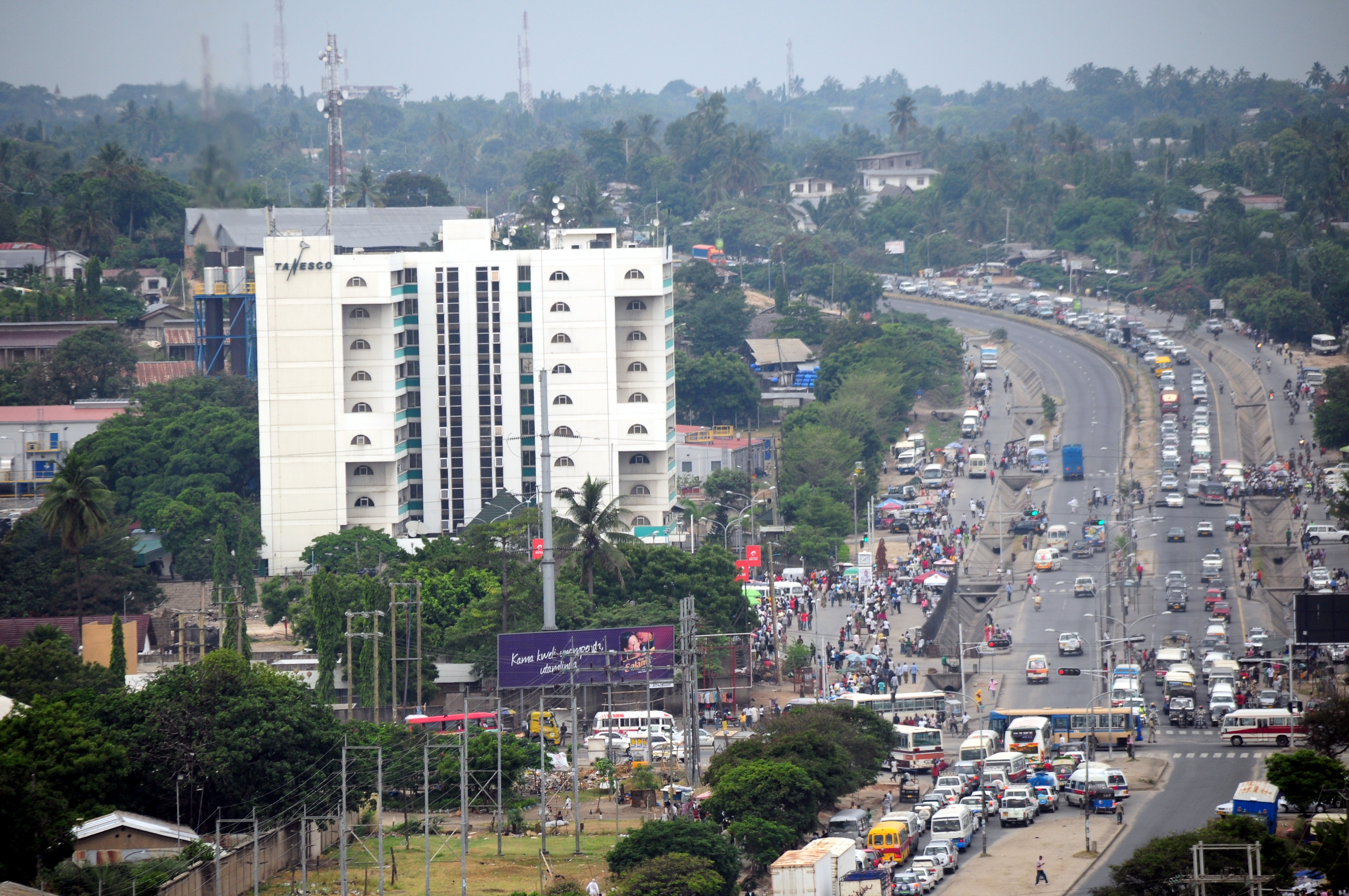
The TANESCO Headquarters, based in Ubungo. The picture is facing towards the west.

Tanesco's management operations is conducted at their headquarters Umeme Park and is located in Ubungo, Dar es salaam. The Management of the company is under the managing director. Currently the managing director is Eng. Boniface Gissima Nyamo-Hanga appointed by the president Samia Suluhu Hassan in September 2023. The company is organised under the following business units: Generation, Transmission, Distribution and Customer Services, Investment, Finance, Information, Communication and Technology, Human Resources and the Legal Counsel.

=== Ownership ===
The Tanzania Electric Supply company ltd. is wholly owned by the Government of Tanzania. It is a public corporation governed by the Public Corporations Act, revised edition 2002.

Tanzania Electric Supply Company Stock Ownership
| Rank | Name of Owner | Number of Shares | Percentage Ownership |
|---|---|---|---|
| 1 | Government of Tanzania | 56,568,418,061 | 100.00 |
| | Total | 56,568,418,061 | 100.00 |

There has been much debate to either privatise the company or list the company on the Dar-es-salaam Stock Exchange. The government however encourages the public sector to enter the market and compete with Tanesco, however, the government is adamant to maintain its public status to help keep the cost of electricity always low for the majority of the population.

=== Business trends ===
The key trends for TANESCO's consolidated Group over recent years are shown below (as at year ending 30 June):

| | 2016 | 2017 | 2018 | 2019 | 2020 |
|---|---|---|---|---|---|
| Revenue (TSh billion) | 1,379 | 1,415 | 1,436 | 1,535 | 1,564 |
| Cost of Sales (TSh billion) | 1,469 | 1,537 | 1,460 | 1,525 | 1,494 |
| Profit after Tax (TSh billion) | (349.5) | (265.3) | (112.5) | (36.2) | 45.2 |
| Total number of customers (000s) | 1,744 | 2,013 | 2,218 | 2,443 | 2,864 |
| Number of Units Sold (m) | 5,549 | 6,059 | 5,729 | 6,551 | |
| Transmission Losses (%) | 6.2 | 6.0 | 5.91 | 5.86 | 5.89 |
| Distribution Losses (%) | 10.9 | 7.9 | 11.83 | 10.35 | 9.41 |
| Number of employees | 5,990 | 6,469 | 6,784 | 6,981 | 7,344 |
| Notes/sources | | | | | |

== Operations ==
Grid & Off-Grid Installed Capacity – 2012 by Fuel Type
1. Hydro (36.9%)
2. Gas (32.9%)
3. Liquid Fuel (24.7%)
4. Biomass (0.20%)
5. Import (0.90%)
6. Thermal (4.40%)

TANESCO's core business are: to generate, transmit, distribute and supply electricity in Tanzanian mainland and sell bulk power to Zanzibar.

The following is the overview of Tanesco's operations As of March 2015:

Generation capacity in the interconnected grid system:

- Total hydro power: 561 MW
- Total gas-fired power plants: 544 MW (only 320 MW is operational)
- Total liquid fuel-fired power plants: 210 MW with 50 MW capacity on short-term rental basis
- Total of 18 isolated mini-grids with total installed capacity of 82 MW. Out of these two mini-grids with installed capacity of 29 MW is running on natural gas while the remaining 15 mini-grids with total installed of capacity of 53 MW are diesel generators.

Transmission network:

- 48 grid substations interconnected by transmission lines
- 2732 km of 220 kV lines
- 1555 km of 132 kV lines
- 578 km of 66 kV lines

Distribution network:

- 11,124 distribution transformers
- 17,021 km of 3 3 kV lines, 5,375 km of 11 kV lines

=== Import and export ===
Tanesco has to import a small amount of its energy from Uganda and Zambia to supply the needs of the bordering regions that are not connected to the national grid. Currently Tanzania only exports electricity to Kenya near the Horo Horo region, and the Isinya–Singida High Voltage Power Line is under construction. With the recent expansion of the Gas Sector in Tanzania the company has major plans to increase exports to neighbouring countries.

== Small power projects ==
=== Overview ===
In 2009 the Government through Energy and Water Utilities Regulatory Authority (EWURA) approved Small Power Project framework. Since the Government didn't have Renewable energy policy in place nor did they have any major plans for energy generation through renewable fuels, the government encouraged Renewable energy projects (mini hydro, biomass, solar and wind) with capacity range between 0.1 MW to 10 MW to be developed. Since introduction of SPPs only mini hydro and biomass power projects are in operation; the high cost of setup, fluctuating foreign exchange prices and low tariffs have discouraged investment. The SPP framework also ties in with The Rural Energy Agency (REA) and they are responsible for financing of rural electrification projects. This is mainly extension of grid connected and mini-grid connected distribution network to the rural areas.

=== Tariffs ===
Small power producers are allowed to sell their power directly to the consumer and sell the excess to Tanesco. However, the tariffs of sale have been decided by Tanesco to maintain public interest. Below is a table showing the possible tariff cases an SPP can engage in; an SPP can engage in one case or a combination of many.

| | Connected to main grid | Connected to isolated mini-grid |
|---|---|---|
| Selling wholesale | Case 1 | Case 2 |
| Selling retail (directly to final customers) | Case 3 | Case 4 |

== Luku ==
One of the major challenges the firm faced was revenue collection. With thousands of customers defaulting on their electricity payments, Tanesco planned to establish a convenient prepaid metering system for low demand users. Tanesco undertook a prepayment metering project between 1993 and 1997 though world bank funding. The new program was referred to as "Lipa Umeme Kadiri Utumiavyo"(LUKU) meaning "Pay for electricity as you need it" in English. The system allows users to recharge their units from multiple vendors in their communities plus the ability to purchase units using their mobile money accounts. Currently the installation of these meters is restricted to domestic, light industrial and light commercial customers.

== Gallery ==
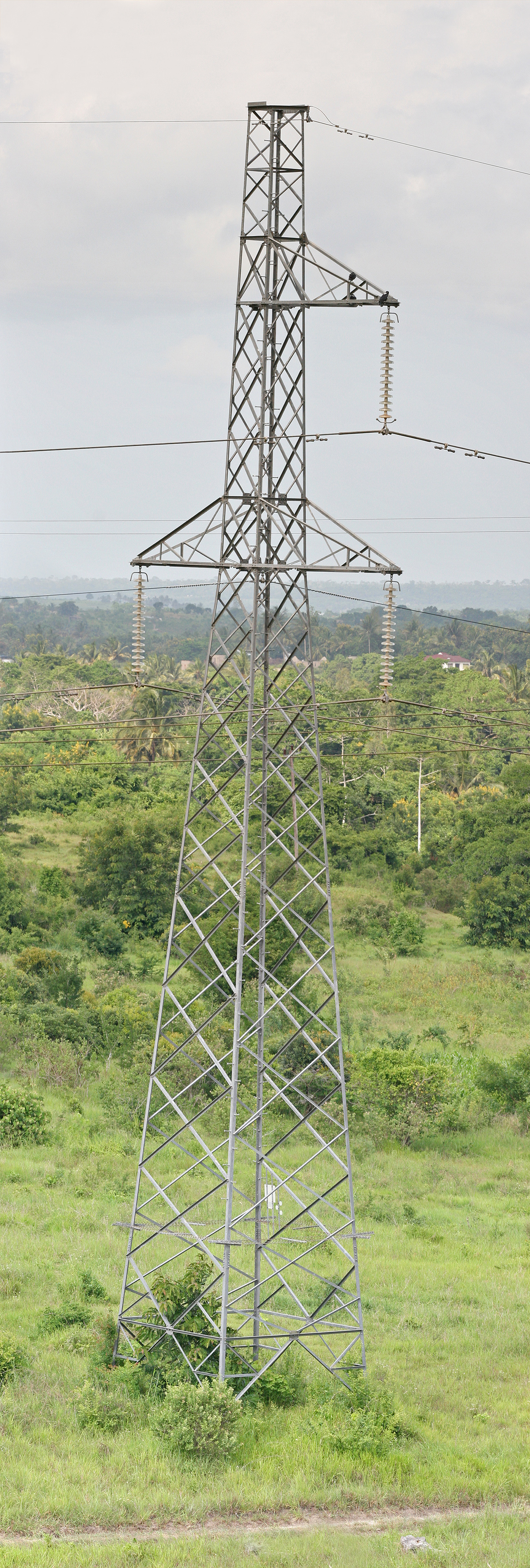
An Electricity Pylon

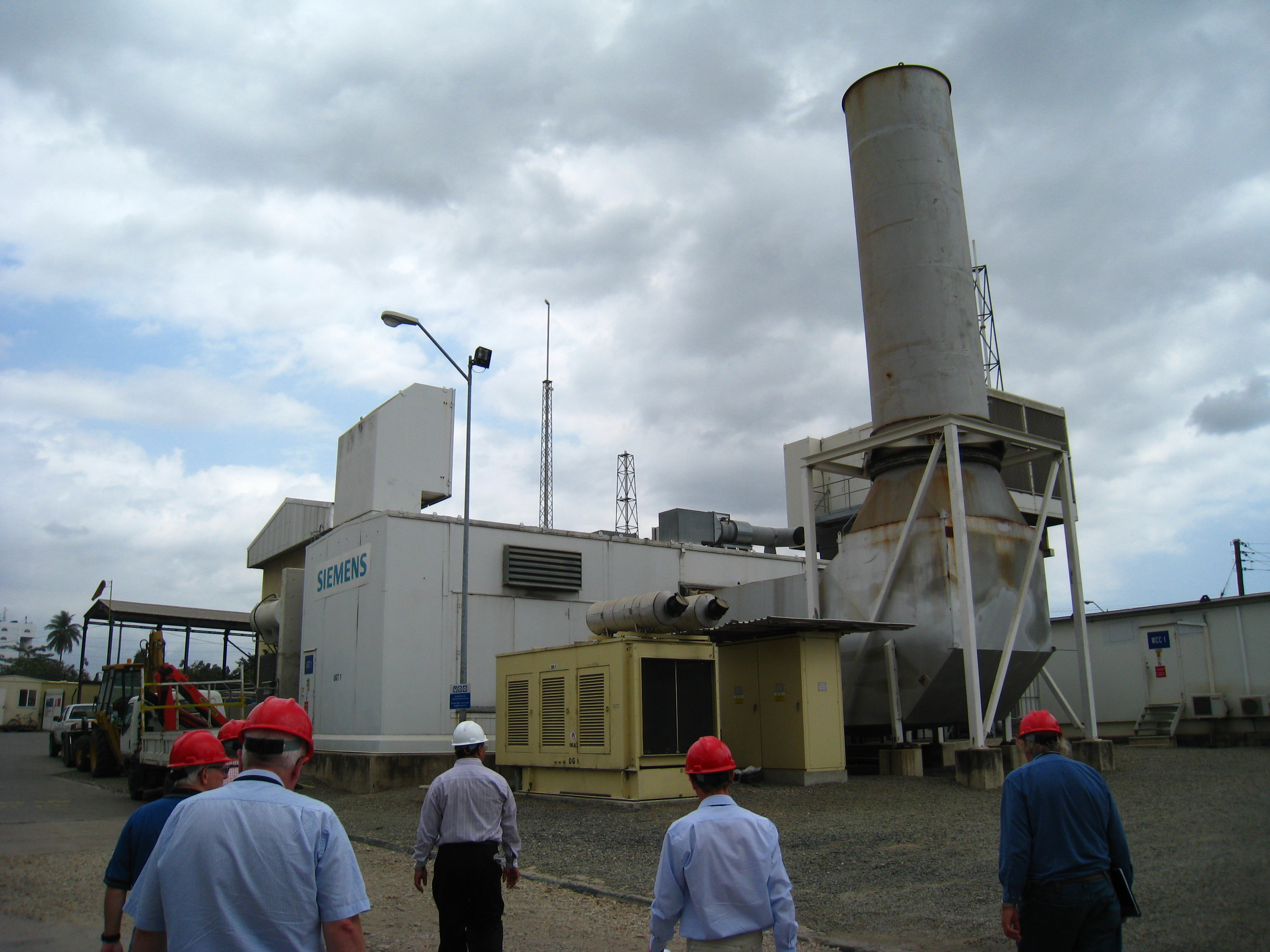
The Ubungo Power Plant

== See also ==
- List of power stations in Tanzania
- Economy of Tanzania
- Electric utility
