= List of schools in Tanzania =

The following is a list of notable schools in Tanzania.

== Schools ==
- Al Muntazir School, Dar es Salaam
- Arusha Secondary School, Arusha
- Braeburn Arusha Main Campus, Kisongo
- Braeburn School, Arusha
- Braeburn Dar es Salaam International School, Mbezi Juu
- Fidel Castro Secondary School, Chake-Chake
- FPCT Tumaini Secondary School, Mpanda
- Goba Secondary School, Goba
- International School of Tanganyika, Dar es Salaam
- International School of Zanzibar, Zanzibar
- Irente School for the Blind Girls, Lushoto
- Isamilo International School Mwanza, Mwanza
- Kennedy House International School, Usa River
- Kibaha Secondary School, Kibaha
- Loyola School, Mabibo Farasi
- Lumumba Secondary School, Saateni
- Mwanza International School, Mwanza
- Saint Mary Goreti Secondary School, Moshi
- School of St Jude, Arusha
- Shaaban Robert Secondary School, Dar es Salaam
- St Francis Girls' Secondary School, Mbeya
- St Mary's Mbeya Secondary School, Mbeya
- St. Peter Claver High School, Dodoma
- United World College East Africa, Moshi
- Weruweru Secondary School, Kilimanjaro

== See also ==
- Education in Tanzania
- Lists of schools
