= Mussa =

Mussa may refer to:

== People ==
- Aisha Mohammed Mussa, Ethiopian engineer and politician
- Ali Mussa Daqduq (21st century), Hezbollah explosives expert
- Abu Imran Mussa bin Maimun ibn Abdallah al-Qurtubi al-Israili (1135–1204), rabbi, physician, and philosopher
- Haji Mussa Kitole (21st century), Zanzibari politician
- Meryce Mussa Emmanuel (21st century), Tanzanian politician
- Mohammed Mussa Yakubi (21st century), Afghan extrajudicial prisoner of the United States
- Omar Mussa (footballer, born 1980), Burundian footballer
- Omar Mussa (footballer, born 2000), Belgian footballer

== Places ==
- Mussa, Tanzania, a ward in Arusha District Council

== Biology ==
- Mussa (coral), a stony coral genus
