= Oltroto =

Ward in Arusha Rural District, Arusha Region

Oltoroto Ward Kata ya Oltoroto (Swahili)
- Ward
- Kata ya Oltoroto
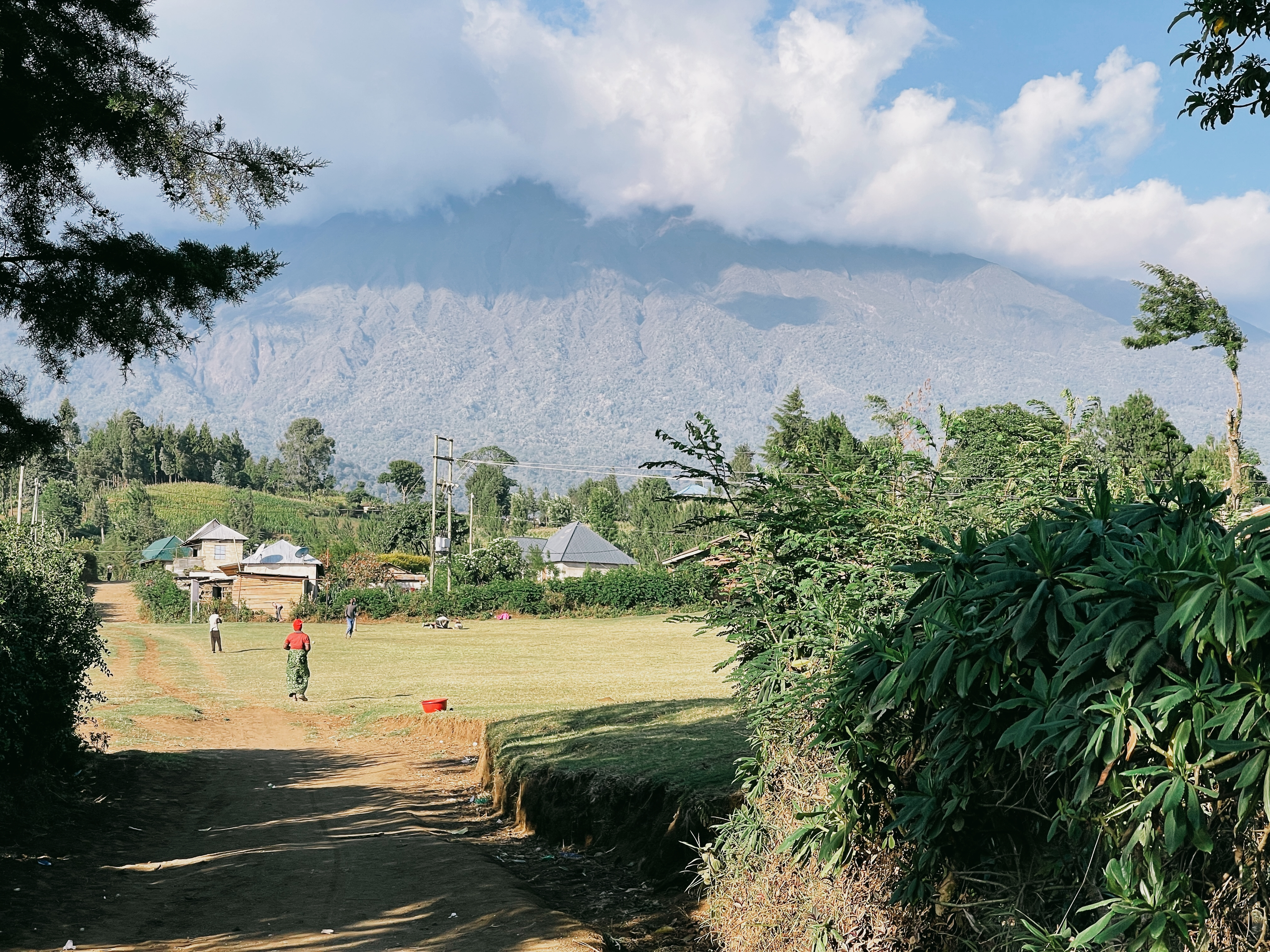
- Central Oltoroto Ward
- Nickname: Land of Oldonyo Sapuk
- Location within Tanzania
- Coordinates: 3°20′31.2″S 36°42′32.04″E
- Country: Tanzania
- Region: Arusha Region
- District: Arusha Rural District
- Capital: Village of Oldonyo Sapuk

Area
  - Total: 11.85 km^{2} (4.58 sq mi)
- Elevation: 1,699 m (5,574 ft)
- Highest elevation: 1,850 m (6,070 ft)

Population (2012)
  - Total: 15,451
  - Density: 1,304/km^{2} (3,377/sq mi)
- Demonym: Oltoroti
- Tanzania Postal Code: 23216

Oltroto or also spelt as Oltoroto is a Tanzanian administrative ward located in Arusha Rural District of the Arusha Region. Oltoroto means "a place to collect chalk" in Maasai language. The ward is bordered by Ilkiding'a to the north, Sokon II to the east, Moivo to the south and finally Olorieni and Kiranyi wards to the west. The ward is home to plateau mountain called Oldonyo Sapuk and on the east of the ward is Kivesi Hill at 1,897 meters tall. The ward covers an area of 11.85 km^{2} (4.58 sq mi), and has an average elevation of 1,699 m (5,574 ft). According to the 2012 census, the ward had a total population of 15,451

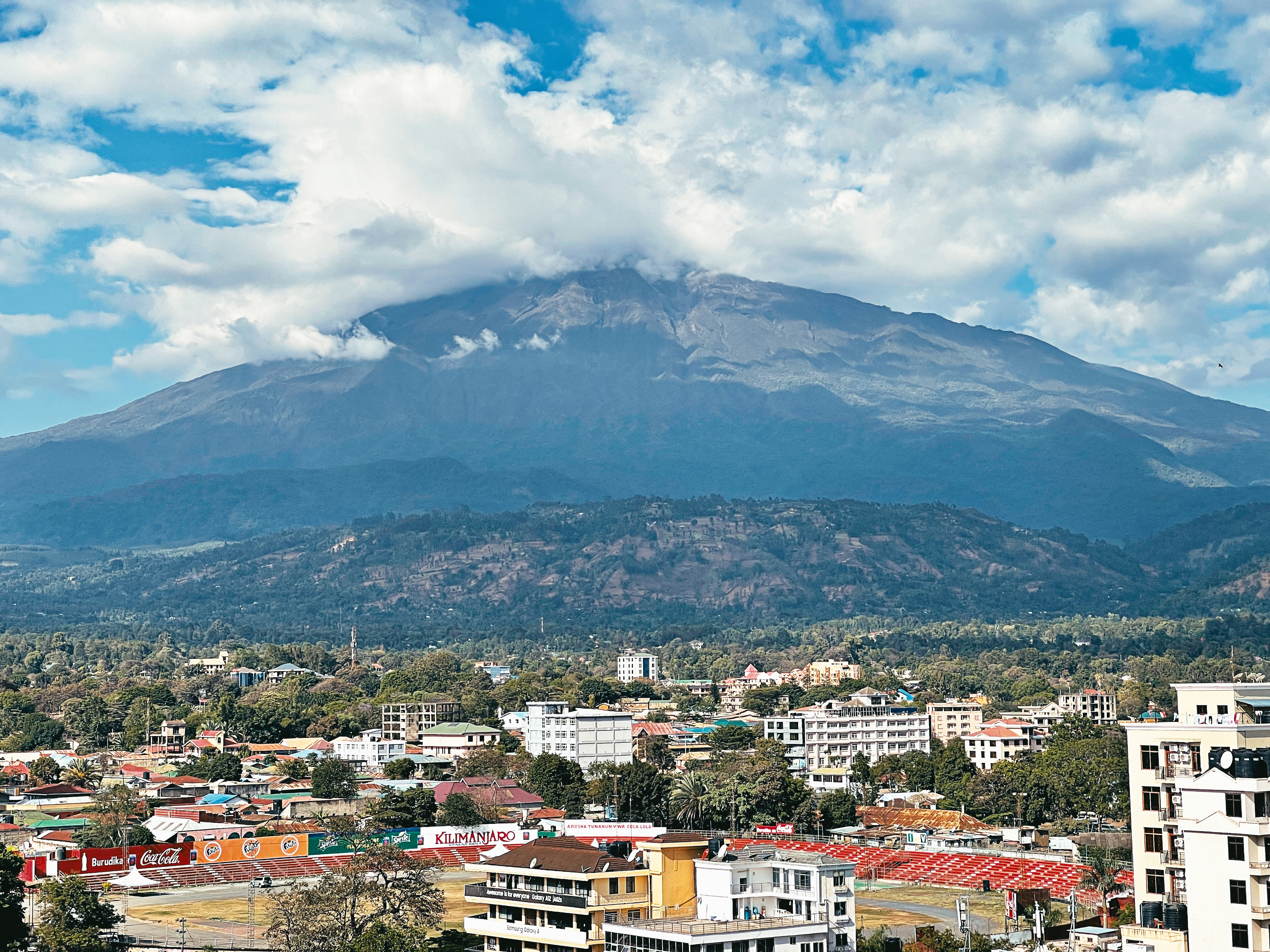
Oldonyo Sapuk view, Meru in the background.

== Economy ==
Oltoroto ward's economy is dominated by subsistence agriculture that supplies the city of Arusha with farm produce goods such as milk and vegetables. There are no major industries in the ward.

== Administration and neighborhoods ==
The postal code for Oltoroto ward is 23216. The ward is divided into the following neighborhoods:

- Ilikirevi, Oltoroto
- Kivulul, Oltoroto
- Oldonyosapuk, Oltoroto
- Olgilai, Oltoroto

== Education ==
Oltoroto ward is home to these educational institutions:

- Enyoito Secondary School
- Ilboru Secondary School

== Healthcare ==
Oltoroto ward is home to the following health institutions:

- Oldonyosapuk Health Center
