= Mateves =

Ward in Arusha Rural District, Arusha Region

Mateves Ward Kata ya Mateves (Swahili)
- Ward
- Kata ya Mateves
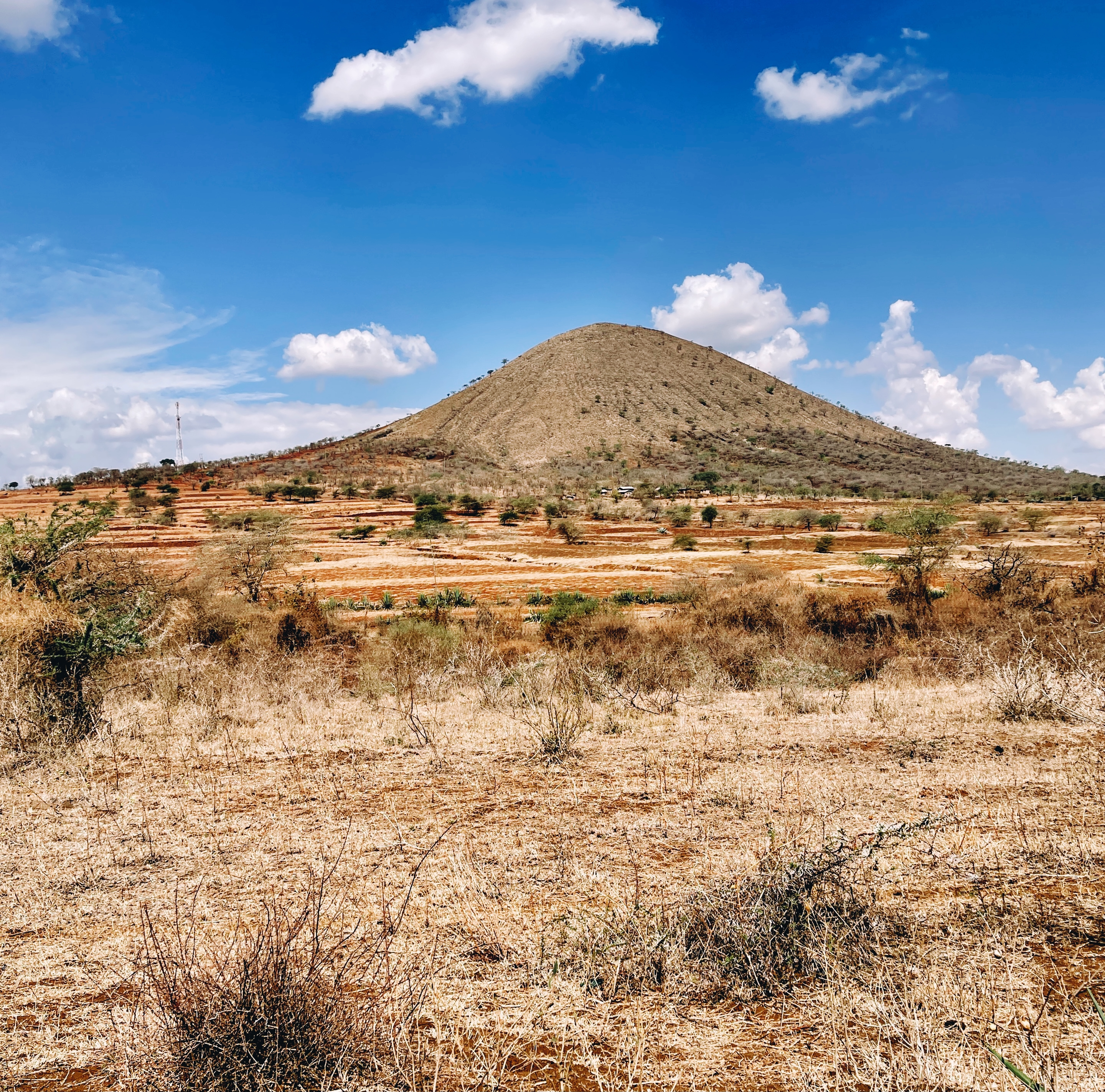
- Loljoro from the south view, Mateves
- Etymology: Place of fever trees
- Location within Tanzania
- Coordinates: 3°22′25.68″S 36°34′20.28″E
- Country: Tanzania
- Region: Arusha Region
- District: Arusha Rural District
- Capital: Village of Ngorbob

Area
  - Total: 104.4 km^{2} (40.3 sq mi)
- Elevation: 1,328 m (4,357 ft)
- Highest elevation: 1,585 m (5,200 ft)

Population (2012)
  - Total: 15,632
  - Density: 149.7/km^{2} (387.8/sq mi)
- Demonym: Matevi
- Tanzanian Postal Code: 23221

Mateves is a Tanzanian administrative ward located in Arusha Rural District of the Arusha Region. It is one of 21 administrative wards in the district. Mateves means places where the fever tree grows in the Maasai language. Mateves ward is bordered by Musa ward to the northwest, Oltrumet ward to the far northeast, a tip of the Olorieni ward to the northeast as well. Olasiti ward borders Mateves to the north east and Terrat to the south east. To the south of Mateves is Oljoro ward and the southwest of Mateves is the Moita Ward and lastly, towards the west is Kisongo ward. The small town of Ngorbob is the seat of the ward. The ward is home to the Mungu Crater and Loljoro Hill at 1,585 meters. The ward covers an area of 104.4 km^{2} (40.3 sq mi), and has an elevation of 1,328 m (4,357 ft). According to the 2012 census, the ward had a total population of 15,632

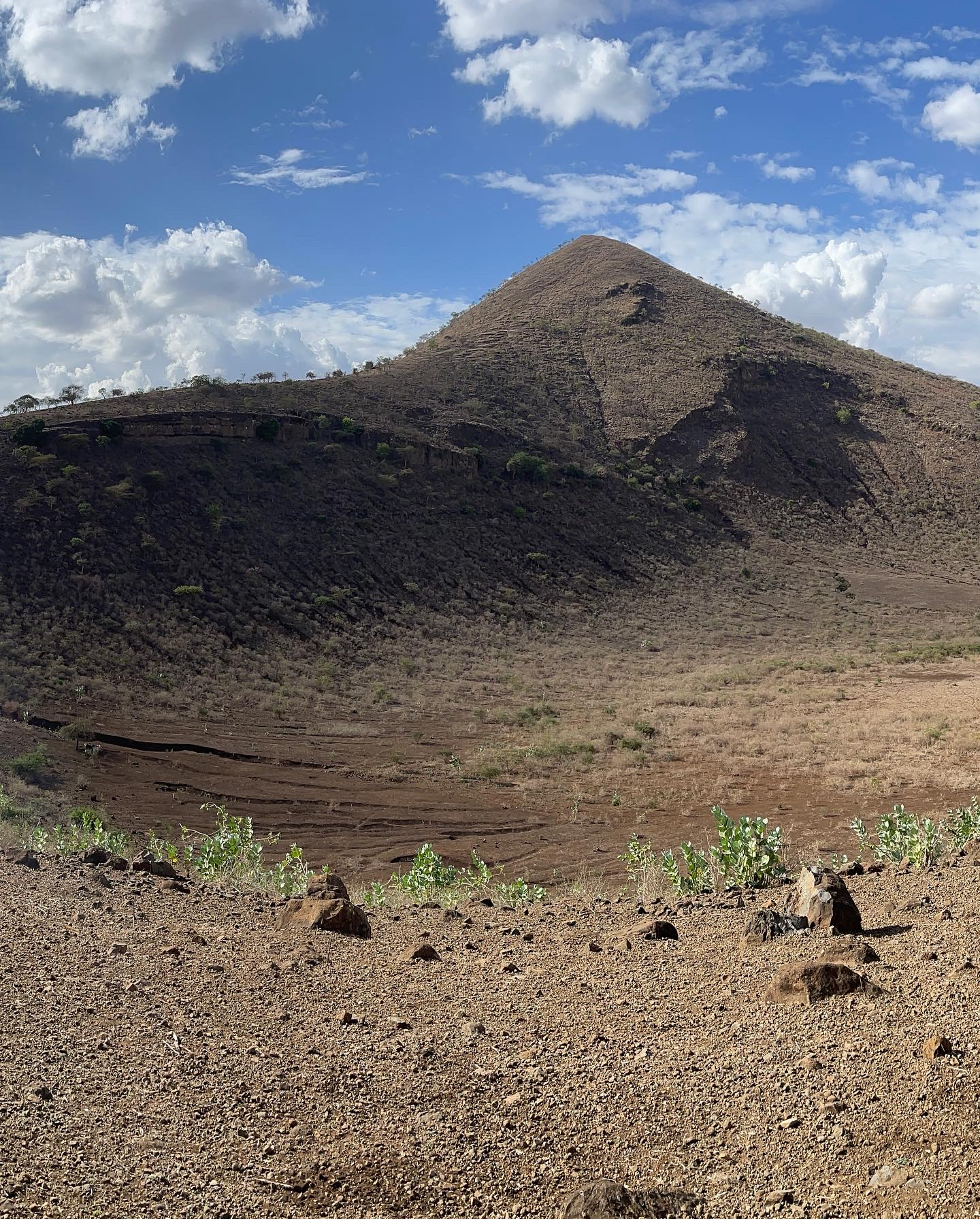
Loljoro Crater and Peak, Mateves ward

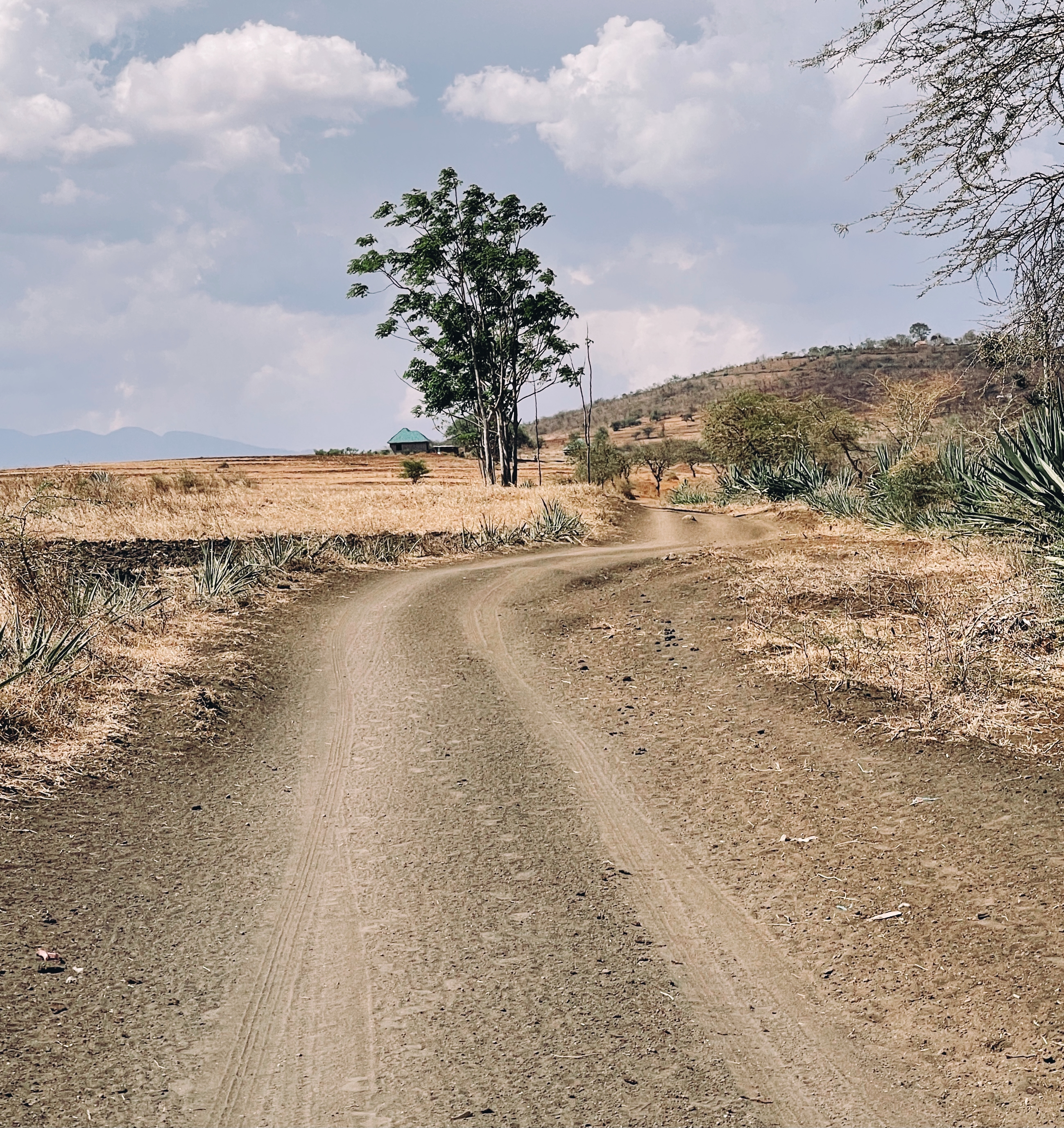
Country road, Mateves Ward

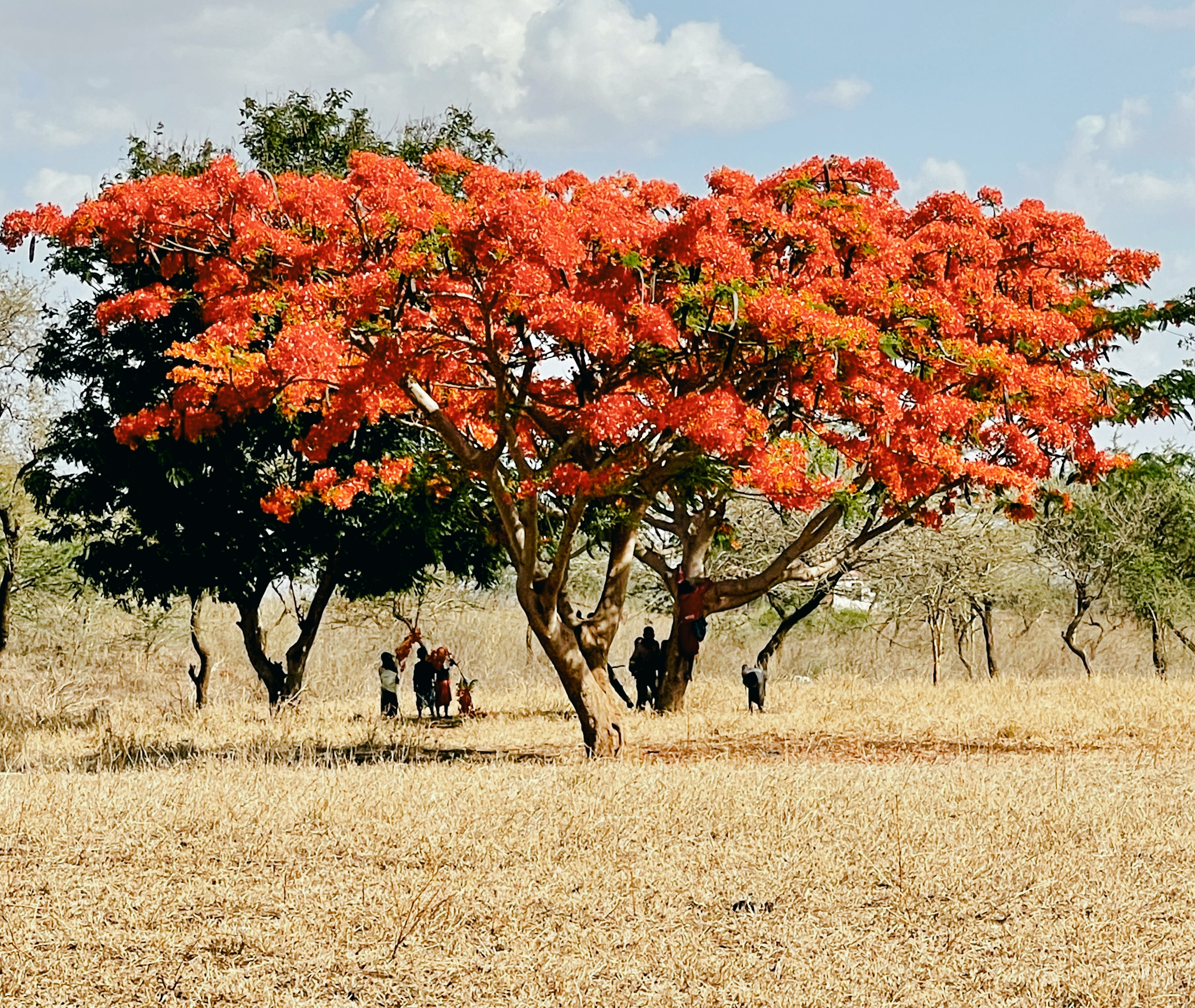
Flame trees in Mateves

== Economy ==
Mateves ward is home to A to Z Textile Mills LTD, which is the largest textile factory in Arusha region and the biggest employer in Mateves ward. The town of Kisongo is actually located inside Mateves ward and not in Kisongo ward as the name entails. Thus Kisongo is the largest settlement in Arusha Rural District which in turn allows for Mateves ward have the highest GDP in the district.

== Administration and neighborhoods ==
The postal code for Mateves Ward is 23221. The ward is divided into the following neighborhoods:

- Laroi, Mateves
- Lemugur, Mateves
- Ngorbob, Mateves

== Education ==
Mateves ward is home to these educational institutions:

- Braeburn International School Arusha (private)
- Mateves Secondary School
- Saint Gemma Galgan Primary School (private)
- Africa Academy Arusha Science School (private)
- Hope School (private)
- Taifa Institute of Health and Allied Sciences College (private)
- Bethany Primary School (private)
- Yakini Primary School
- St. Joseph Ngarenaro Primary School (private)
- Upendo Friends School (private)

== Healthcare ==
Mateves ward is home to the following health institutions:

- Kisongo Charitable Health Center (private)
- Olmoti Health Center
- Ngorbob Medical Center
- Nanovegic Health services (private)
- Mateves Dispensary
- Kisongo Lutheran Medical Center
