= Nduruma =

Ward in Arusha Rural, Arusha, Tanzania

Nduruma Kata ya Nduruma
- Ward
- Location within Tanzania
- Coordinates: 3.491111°S 36.812222°E
- Country: Tanzania
- Region: Arusha Region
- District: Arusha Rural District
- Established: 1984

Government
  - Type: Council

Area
  - Total: 62.72 km^{2} (24.22 sq mi)
- Elevation: 1,041 m (3,415 ft)

Population (2012)
  - Total: 12,042
  - Density: 192.0/km^{2} (497.3/sq mi)
- Time zone: EAT
- Area code: 027
- Website: District Website

Nduruma, is a administrative ward in Arusha Rural District in the east Arusha Region of Tanzania. It is bordered to the north by Mlangarini, to the south by Bwawani, and to the east by Kikwe ward of the Meru District. The ward covers an area of 62.72 square kilometres (24.22 sq mi) with an average elevation of 1,041 metres (3,415 ft).

In 2012 national census there were 12,042 people in the ward, from 10,316 in 2002 when it was part of the former Arumeru District. The ward has 190 inhabitants per square kilometre (490/sq mi).

The Nduruma River flows from near the top of Mount Meru down to Nduruma. There are three groups of farmers on the river in competition for the water rights of the river. Local small scale farmers on the upper and lower parts of the river, and international large corporations farm the middle part of the river near Arusha city which is called Plastic Valley because of their many large greenhouse farms. The middle part of the river has been owned by Europeans since the Germans arrived in the 1800s. After World War I the English took over the farms. Today they are owned mostly by Dutch companies who now grow flowers there.
