= Braeburn High School =

Coordinates: 1°17′21″S 36°45′22″E

Information
- Motto: Summum Appeto (Seeking the Top)
- Established: 1968
- Age: 3 to 18
- Language: English

Braeburn High School is a private international school located on Gitanga Road in the Lavington suburb of Nairobi, Kenya.

== History ==
The school was founded in 1968 and was called Braeburn House International School.

In 1979 the school consisted of one classroom block and a two-storey house. The Early Years unit and the Year 1 block had no roof at the time. The children have always worn a purple uniform.

A sixth form centre was opened in 2010, allowing pupils to complete their entire school education from 3–18 at the school.

== Operations ==
The school follows British National Curriculum and has over 300 students.

Adjacent to the school is Braeburn School, a primary school. These are owned by the Braeburn Group, which also operates Braeburn College (Nairobi), Mombasa International School, Kisumu International School and Braeburn School Arusha (in Tanzania).

The school motto is summum appeto, a motto it shares with other schools in the Braeburn Group, which is Latin for 'Seeking the Top'.

== See also ==
- Education in Kenya
- List of international schools
- List of schools in Kenya
