= Sokon II, Arusha District =

Ward in Arusha District of the Arusha Region of Tanzania

Sokon II Kata ya Sokon II (Swahili)
- Ward of Arusha District
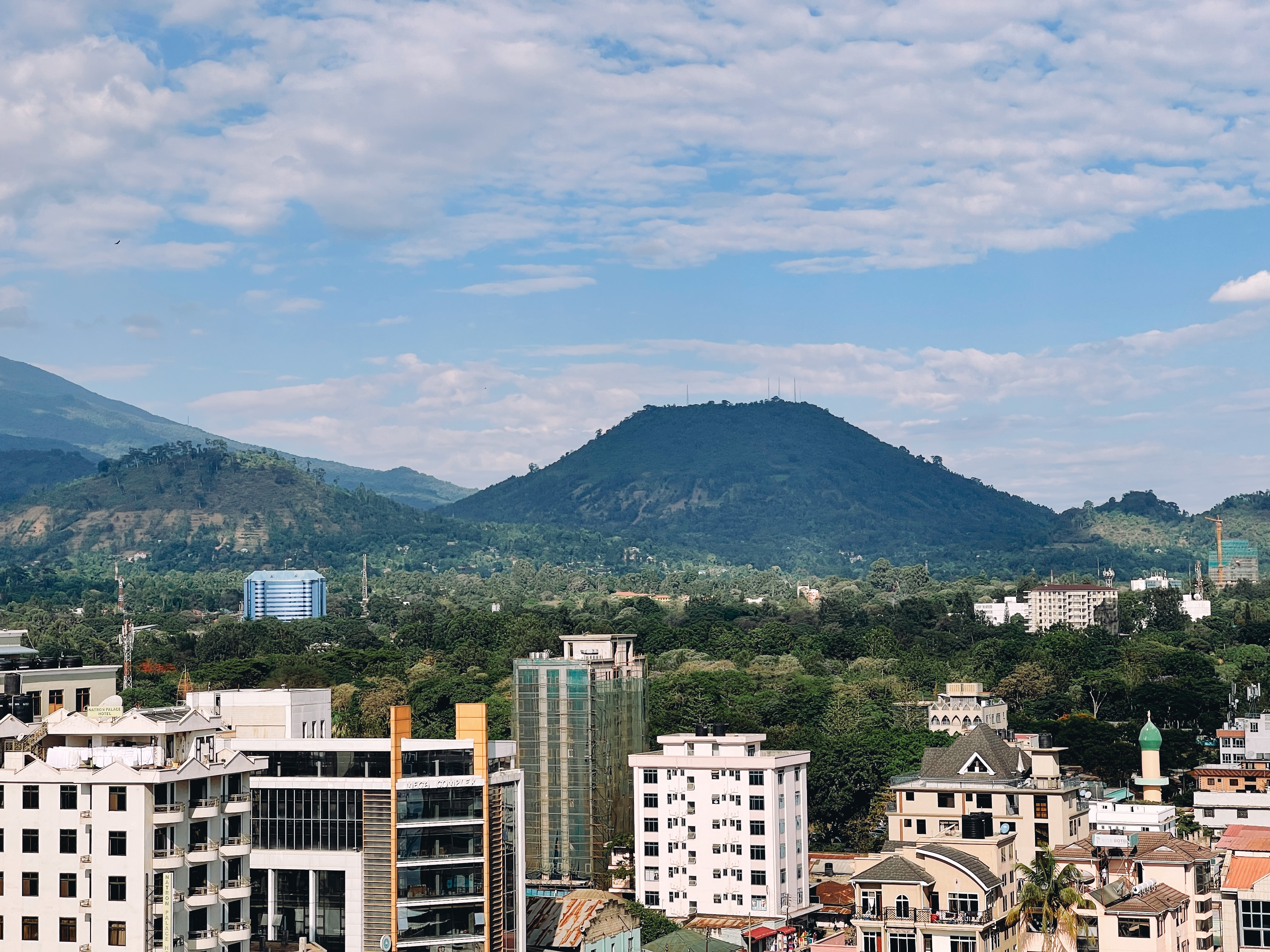
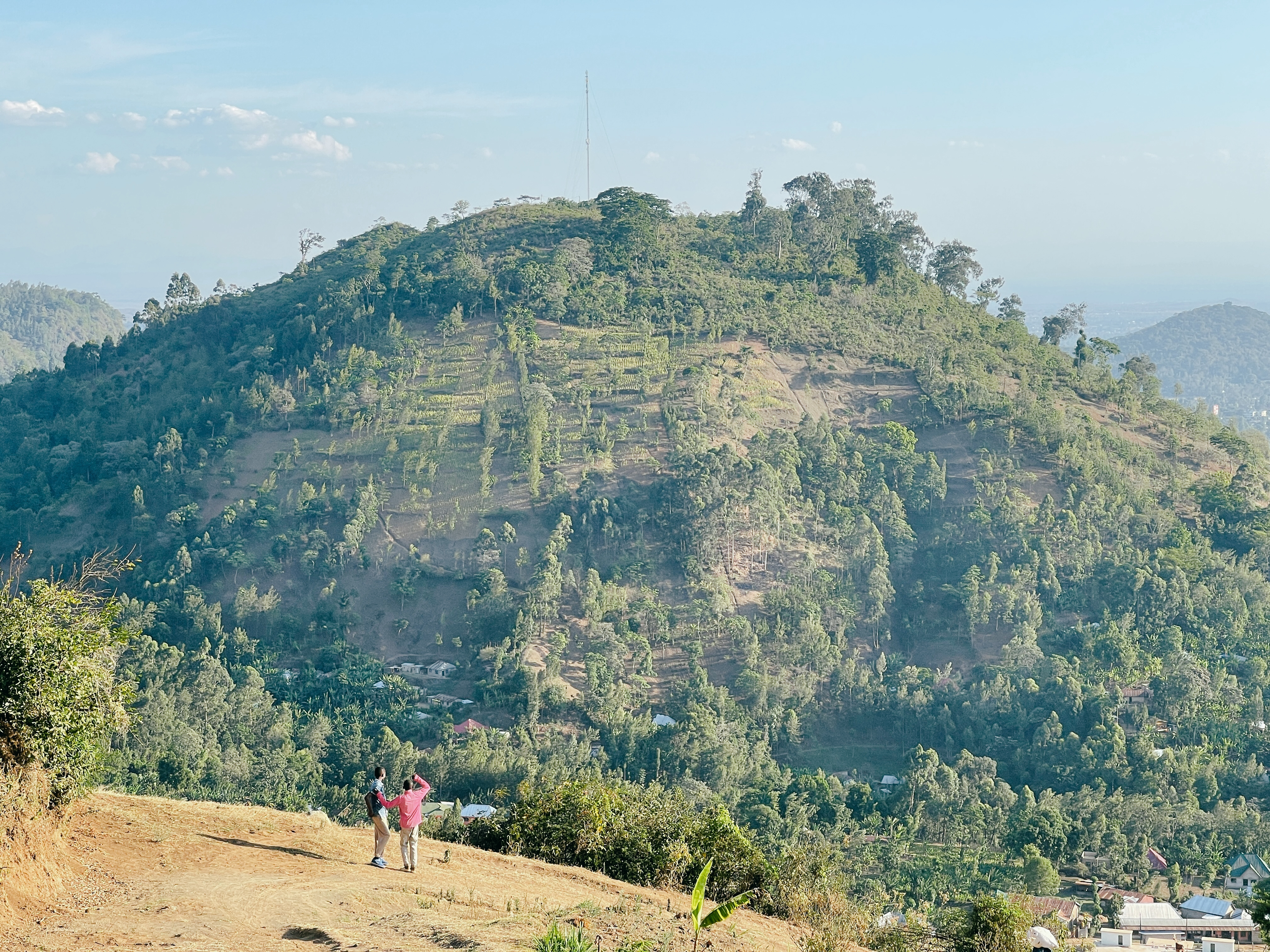
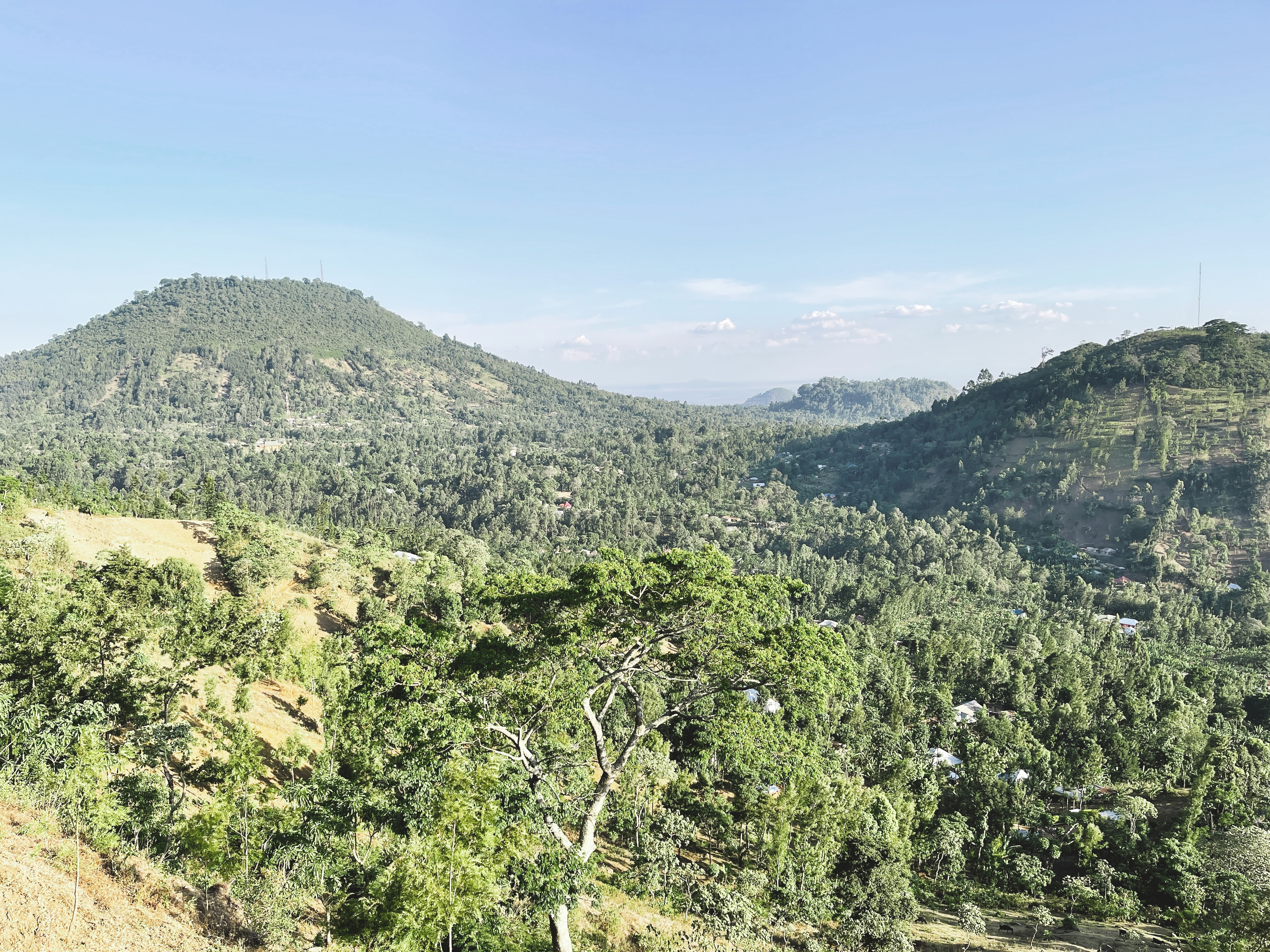
- From top to bottom: View of Sokon II from Arusha City; A hill in Sokon II; View of Sokon II from Oltroto ward
- Nickname: "Mountain market"
- Location within Tanzania
- Coordinates: 3°20′23″S 36°44′9.2″E
- Country: Tanzania
- Region: Arusha Region
- District: Arusha District
- Headquarters: Oldadai Village

Area
  - Total: 4.05 km^{2} (1.56 sq mi)
- Elevation: 1,713 m (5,620 ft)

Population (2012)
  - Total: 32,073
  - Density: 7,920/km^{2} (20,500/sq mi)
- Demonym: Sokoni
- Tanzanian Postal Code: 23208

Sokon II (Kata ya Sokon II, in Swahili) is one of the 27 administrative wards of the Arusha District Council located in the Arusha Region of Tanzania. The name Sokon comes from the Swahili word for market, sokoni. The ward shares a similar name with another ward located in Arusha Urban District called Sokon I and the former is one of 27 rural administrative wards in the district as of 2012. Sokon II ward is bordered by Oltoroto and Moivo ward in the west, Ilkiding'a ward to the north, Bangata ward to the east. On the southern border Sokon II is bordered by Baraa, Kimandolu and Sekei wards. According to the 2012 census, the ward has a total population of 32,073. Thus, Sokon II is the most populous ward in Arusha District. Also the ward headquarters are Oldadai village. In addition, the Arusha District Administration building is located in Sokon II ward.

== Geography ==
The ward is home to major foothills of Mount Meru, namely, Kivutu at 1,944 meters tall and Kivesi Hill at 1,897 meters tall, and the smaller Nariva Hill at the south side of the ward.

== Economy ==
Like many economies of Arusha Rural District, Sokon II ward's economy is dominated by subsistence agriculture. However, Sokon II is the Seat of the Arusha Rural District thus the services catering to the administration of the ward are located there. Available attractions like Napuru Falls and the Kivesi and Kivutu hills.

== Administration ==
The postal code for Sokon II Ward is 23208. The ward is divided into the following neighborhoods/villages (mitaa):

- Achi
- Ilkilorit
- Kijave
- Kimelok
- Kiutu
- Kivesi
- Longidare
- Mishorori
- Nambere
- Ngires
- Ngoikaa
- Ngoilenya
- Oldadai
- Olevolos
- Olturoto
- Simanjiro
- Sokon II
- Soyen

=== Government ===
The ward, like every other ward in the country, has local government offices based on the population served. The Sokon II Ward administration building houses a court as per the Ward Tribunal Act of 1988, including other vital departments for the administration the ward. The ward has the following administration offices:

- Sokon II Ward Police Station located in Kati neighbirhood
- Sokon II Ward Government Office (Afisa Mtendaji, Kata ya Sokon II) in Sokon II Neighborhood
- Karatu Ward Tribunal (Baraza La Kata) is a Department inside Ward Government Office

In the local government system of Tanzania, the ward is the smallest democratic unit. Each ward is composed of a committee of eight elected council members which include a chairperson, one salaried officer (with no voting rights), and an executive officer. One-third of seats are reserved for women councillors.

== Education and health ==
=== Education ===
Sokon II ward is home to these educational institutions:

- Oldadai Primary School
- Sekei Primary School
- Sokon II Secondary School
- Oldadai Secondary School
- Walikabaa English Medium School (private)
- Ngiresi Secondary School (private)
- Sakura Girls Secondary School (private)
- Green Acres School (private)

=== Healthcare ===
Sokon II ward is home to the following health institutions:

- Sekei LCC Health Center
- Oldadai Health Center
- Sokon II Dispensary
- Nigresi Health Center
