= Braeside School =

Braeside School may refer to:

- Braeside School (Nairobi), a day school in Lavington, Nairobi
- Braeside School, Buckhurst Hill, an independent school in Buckhurst Hill, Essex (closed 2025)
- Braeside School (Highland Park, Illinois), a school on the National Register of Historic Places in Highland Park, Illinois
