= Marion Moon =

Kenyan organic farmer (born 1983)

Marion Atieno Moon (born 5 December 1983) is a Kenyan organic farmer and managing director of Wanda Organic, a company that improves farmer productivity using bio-organic fertilisers. She was among seven recipients of a grant from the US Agency for International Development (USAID) under the Feed the Future initiative.

== Early life and education ==
Marion Atieno was born in Kenya and brought up in Nairobi. She attended Braeside School, Brookhouse School and St Mary's School in Kenya for her early education, before studying Business Administration at Macquarie University in Australia, graduating in 2006.

== Career ==
She first worked at the Kenya tourism board as an intern before joining the media and advertising agency Scangroup as a media planner. She worked for the insurance firm AoN in Kampala, Uganda, as an executive assistant before leaving in 2011 She chose to leave because while she was successful at her job, she did not feel fulfilled by the work; she said: "I was doing really well, but to what end was it?" Moon also wanted to do something that would be closer to home.

Kenyan soils have been depleted over the years and so Moon decided to pursue using organic fertilisers, creating Wanda Organic in 2012. The choice of organic fertilizer was deliberate: inorganic types have helped deplete nutrients from the soil over time. She had visited Philippines and Thailand, where she learnt about organic fertilizers, which had been successfully used in those countries. As she learned about organic fertilizers, she came in contact with Eliseo Cruiz, who had created a brand known as Plantmate. Her company, Wanda Organic, imports organic fertiliser from the Philippines where it is cheaply produced. Moon sold her cars and house and moved back to her parents' home in order to make her business succeed. At first Moon had a difficult time raising capital; however, she was able to get a grant from USAID in 2014 for a proof-of-concept for her business. Moon, with funding from USAID had by 2014, conducted trials with farmers in 35 trial farms in Kenya. The end goal of the program is also to not just continue importing fertiliser, but to eventually set up production in Kenya. Moon's work has had a positive effect on farmers in the area who have seen better crop yields and improvements to their living standards.
