= 2013 Dar es Salaam building collapse =

Structural failure in Tanzania

Coordinates: 6°49′5.98″S 39°17′4.73″E

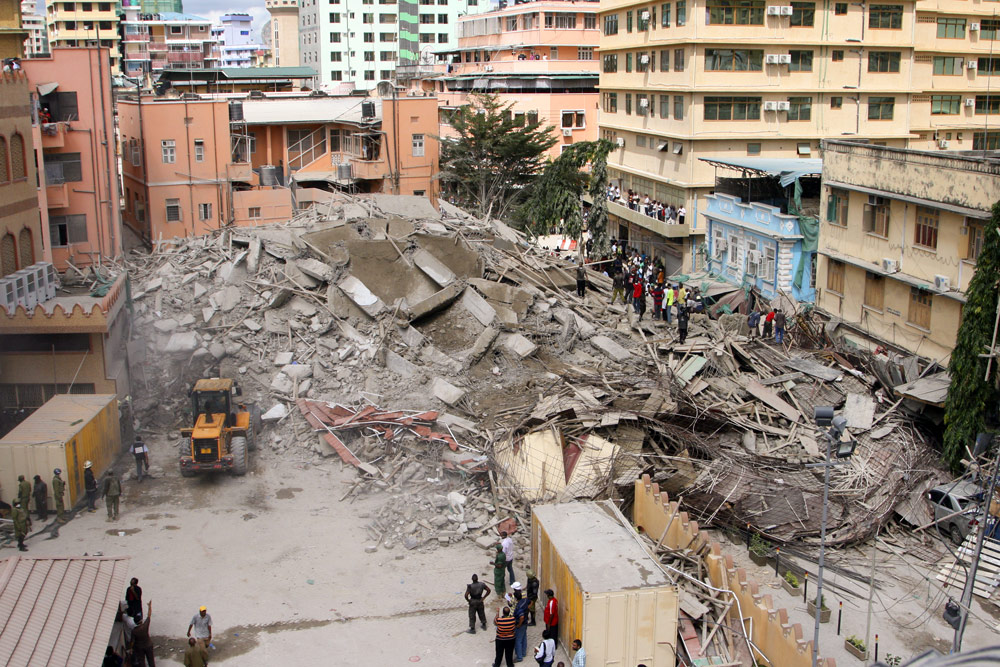
- Rubble left after the collapse
- Date: 29 March 2013
- Time: 08:25 local time (05:25 UTC)
- Location: Indira Gandhi Street, Dar es Salaam, Tanzania
- Deaths: 36 Total, 32 adults, 4 children
- Injuries: 17/18

The Dar es Salaam building collapse occurred during the early hours of Good Friday on 29 March 2013 when a 16-floor residential apartment building collapsed on a nearby mosque compound, killing 36 people and trapping over 60 under the rubble.

== Background ==
The building was owned by Raza Huseein Damji with the National Housing Corporation (NHC) having a 25 percent share in the project. Poor building design was the suspected cause for the collapse, Kheri Kessy, the Deputy Mayor of Ilala said in 2007, as the approved plan was for a 10 floor apartment building project. The project inspector ensured protocol was followed but when the ten floors were completed the oversight responsibility changed to a different governmental body. The Contractors Registration Board (CRB) Engineers Registration Board (ERB) claimed a stop order was issued when the building exceeded the 10 floor plan approval. The plan limitation was ignored when at the time of collapse there were 16 completed floors and another projected 3 floors to be constructed. Substandard concrete and steel bar reinforcement were cited as reasons that led to the collapse.

The Tanzanian Red Cross expressed relief that the casualty figures could have been far higher but the streets were relatively empty of vendors and shoppers due to the holiday.

== Second building ==
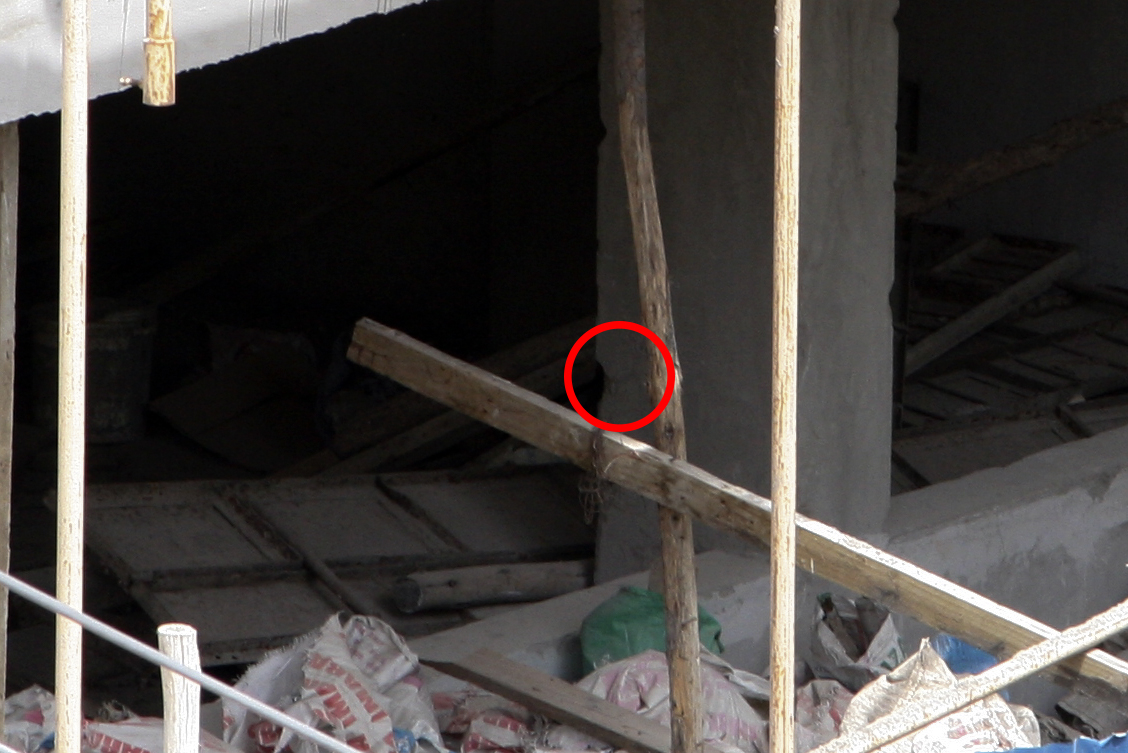
Work on a nearby building of the same owner and construction company has been halted after reports emerged of cracks in the pillars

Construction of a nearby building of the same owner and under the same construction company was immediately ordered to stop pending an investigation after reports that it had developed cracks as well. A week after the collapse, on 5 April, The Minister for Lands, Housing and Human Settlements Development, Prof Anna Tibaijuka issued an order for the owner to demolish the second 16-storey building, based on information gathered by government officials that it was ill-constructed as well. Similar to the first, the owner erected a 16-storey structure instead of 10 floors as the building permit stipulated. She said, "We are tired of mourning and now it’s time to take action. That building was given a permit for ten floors only but the developer ignored the limitation..." The owner was given 30 days to comply with this order. The order was delayed while the government agencies discussed options. On May 29, 2013, two months after the collapse of the first building, the Ilala municipality issued a one-week demolition notice to the owners of the building.

== Reactions ==
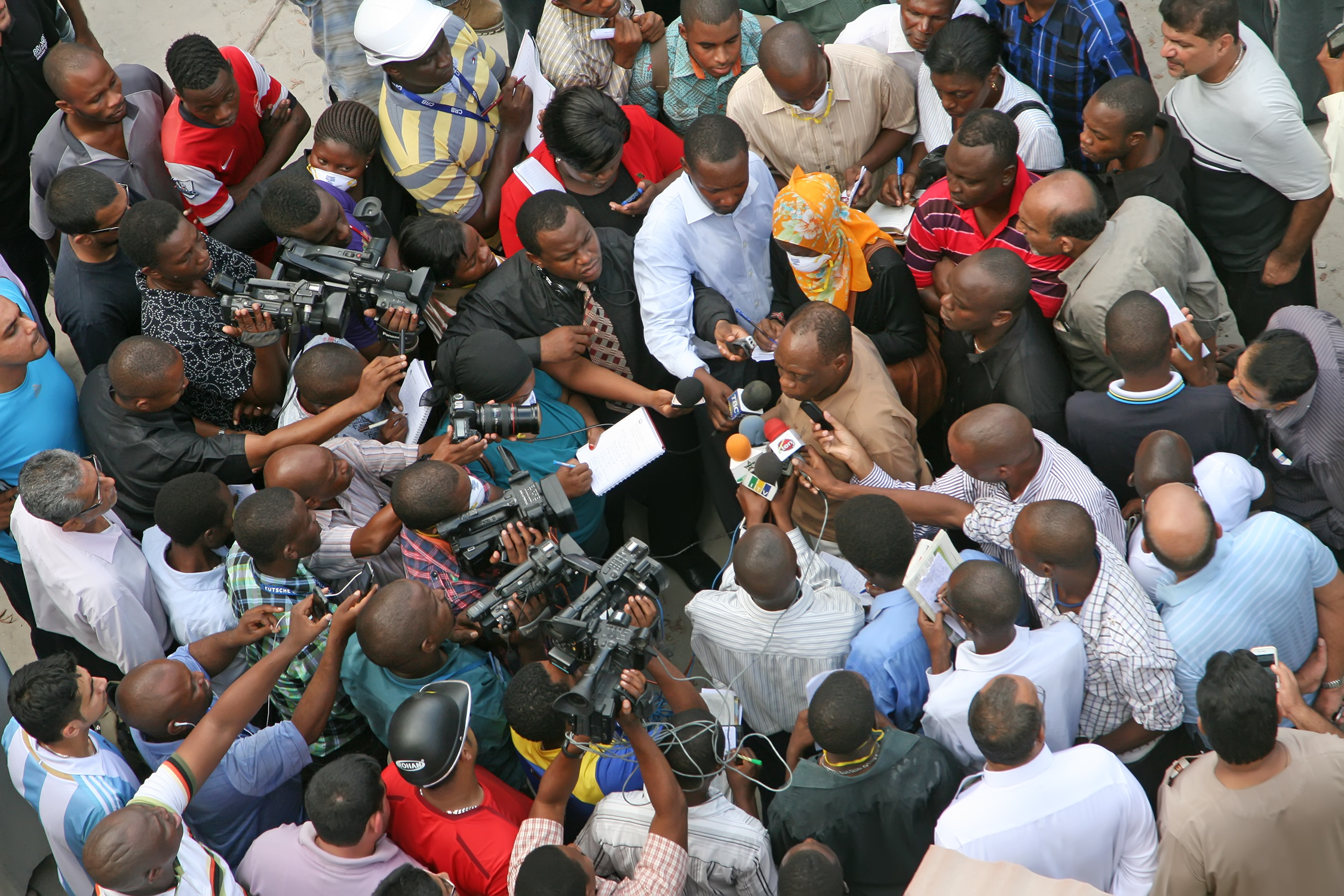
On site, Police chief Suleiman Kova said the owner of the building would be held responsible

President Jakaya Kikwete who visited the site expressed his sorrow and tweeted his prayers for those afflicted by the tragedy. On a second visit the next day, he ordered for strict supervision of construction projects. "The municipal Chief Engineer, Ilala District Chief Inspector of buildings, owner of the building and whoever is connected to the scam must face justice," Kikwete ordered.

Professor Ibrahim Lipumba, leader of the Civic United Front visited the site as well where he said, "Innocent lives have been shuttered down. Authorities should have questioned from the beginning the legality for continued construction of the additional floors of the building against the agreed ten floors. Serious inspection of buildings must be a routine duty."

Dar regional police chief, Suleiman Kova, said, "the owner of the building would be held responsible and taken to task".

Weeks after the incident, in the parliament budget speech, Prof Kulikoyela Kahigi said that the government should bear the blame, considering the fact that former Prime Minister Edward Lowassa formed a task force in 2006 to investigate the state of buildings under construction but its recommendations were ignored.

== Victims ==
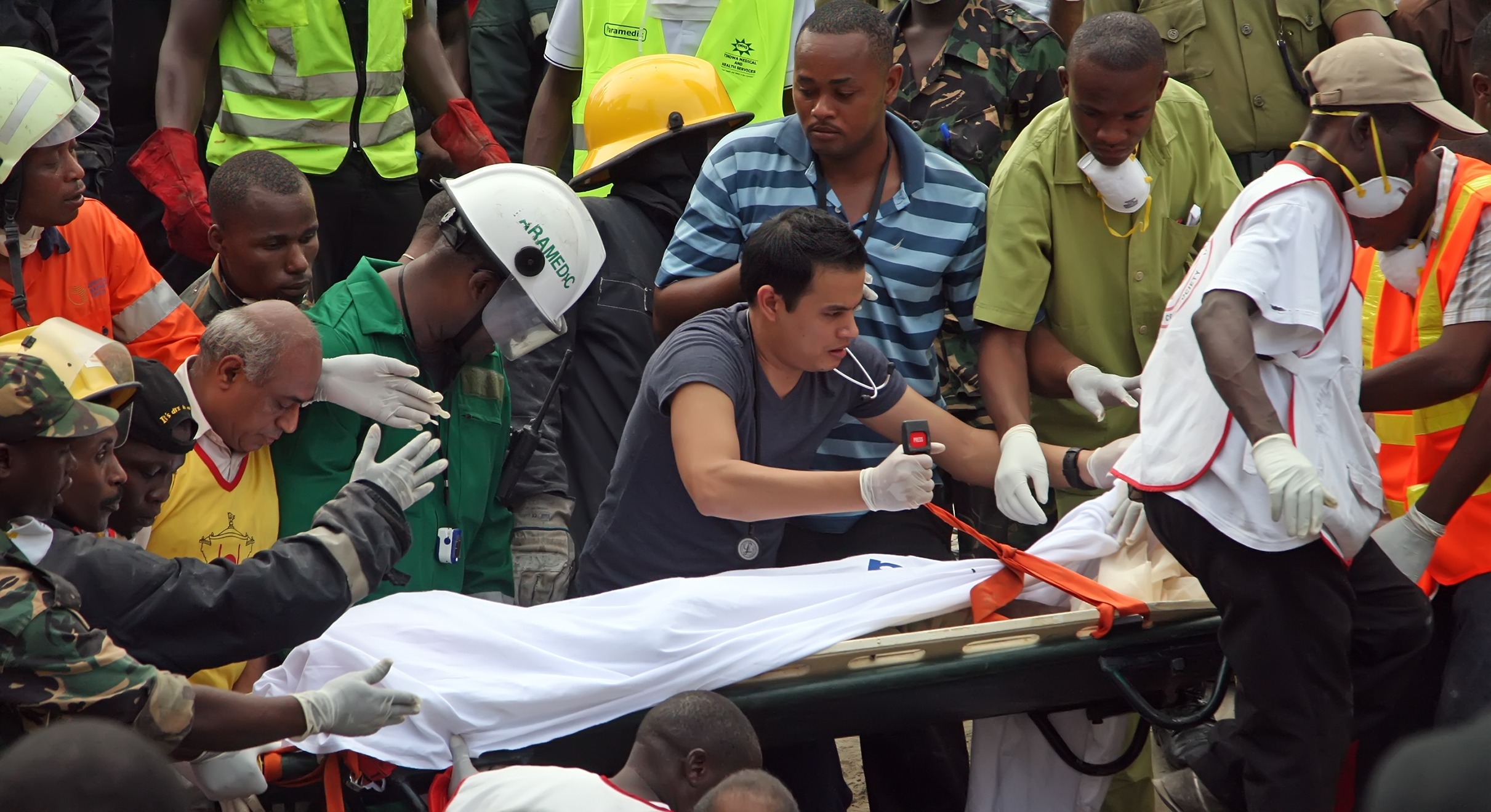
Members of the Tanzanian Red Cross excavate a victim from the rubble

Out of the 36 people killed in the collapse, 25 were identified of which were 4 children and 21 adults. The children were all students of the Al Muntazir School who were playing soccer near a mosque after morning prayers.

== Arrests ==
At the behest of Kikwete, three municipal officials and the engineer were held for questioning over the incident. This was increased to include the owner Raza Damji and his son, Aly Raza Damji. Vedasto Ferdinand, a quantity surveyor was also arrested.

=== Trial ===
On 4 April 2013, 11 suspects were arrested and charged with 24 counts of manslaughter. These included:

- Albert Jonas Munuo, an Assistant Registrar with Architects and Quantity Surveyors Registration Board
- Raza Hussein Ladha Damji, the owner of the building
- Joseph Frank Ringo, a Principal Enforcement Officer with the AQRB
- Charles Salu Ogera, an engineer
- Zonazea Anange Oushoudada, a consulting engineer
- Vedasto Ferdinarnd Ruhola, a Quantity Surveyor
- Michael Loth Hema, an architect
- Goodluck Silvester Mbanga
- Wilbroad Wilbard Mugyabuso
- Ibrahim Mohamed, alias Kisoki
- Mohamed Swaburi Abdulkharim

The owners' son who was also arrested was let go for unknown reasons.

The suspects were remanded until 16 April pending a bail ruling. On 16 April, the magistrate court justice Devotha Kisoka issued bail to the eleven suspects. The conditions of the bail required each of the accused to secure two reliable guarantors, who would have to sign a bond of TSh 20 million (~US$12,300) each and bring along formal letters of introduction from their local governments. The suspects were also ordered to surrender all travel documents and not leave the city without informing the court.
