= Gertrude Rwakatare =

Tanzanian politician (1950–2020)

Gertrude Pangalile Rwakatare (31 December 1950 – 20 April 2020) was a Tanzanian CCM politician and Member of Parliament appointed in 2007 by Jakaya Kikwete, Tanzania's president. She was also the head of Mikocheni B Assemblies of God, a Tanzanian Pentecostal church connected to the Assemblies of God Tanzania.

== Career ==
In the mid-1990s, after Tanzania's transition to a multi-party democracy, Rwakatare founded the St. Mary's school group, multiple schools ranging from nursery to primary schools, high schools (such as St Mary's Mbeya Secondary School) and a teachers' training college. The curriculum, based on the Tanzania National Curriculum, without explicit religious content, takes an international focus with a mission of preparing "children academically and spiritually".

In 1995 Rwakatare founded the Mikocheni B Assemblies of God. Prior to that she worked as a personnel manager for the port authority of Dar es Salaam. She held a Ph.D. in Community Development and Christian Education from the Moody Bible Institute in Chicago.

Rwakatare established in 2006 the Bright Future Orphanage Centre for about 700 children with funding from Mikocheni B church members and international organizations. The orphanage centre has evolved into a grant giving philanthropic body, the St. Mary's Foundation, focusing on the identifying sustainable local solutions to community malaise.

Rwakatare died in Dar es Salaam on 20 April 2020, aged 69 from COVID-19. She was married.

== External sources ==
- https://web.archive.org/web/20160304063131/http://www.raiamwema.co.tz/mada/getrude-rwakatare
- https://web.archive.org/web/20150801194332/http://mountainoffiretz.org/
- http://www.mwananchi.co.tz/habari/Siasa/CCM-yapitisha-wagombea-ubunge/-/1597332/2832322/-/6r2nhnz/-/index.html
- https://www.youtube.com/watch?v=k5dJtkCHSa4
