= Kimnyaki =

Ward in Arusha Rural District, Tanzania

- Ward
- Kata ya Kimnyaki
- Location within Tanzania
- Coordinates: 3°18′34″S 36°38′57″E
- Country: Tanzania
- Region: Arusha Region
- District: Arusha Rural District

Population (2012)
  - Total: 3,487

Kimnyaki is an administrative ward in the Arusha Rural District of the Arusha Region of Tanzania. The name "Kimnyaki" means "we are lucky" in Maasai. According to the 2012 census, the ward has a total population of 3,487.
