= Olkokola =

Ward in Arusha Rural District, Tanzania

- Ward
- Kata ya Olkokola
- Location within Tanzania
- Coordinates: 03°13′35″S 36°37′30″E
- Country: Tanzania
- Region: Arusha Region
- District: Arusha Rural District

Population (2012)
  - Total: 24,728

Olkokola is an administrative ward in the Arusha Rural District of the Arusha Region of Tanzania. According to the 2012 census, the ward has a total population of 24,728.
