= St Francis Girls' Secondary School =

Coordinates: 8.9°S 33.45°E

Location
- Old Forest, Muungano Street; PO Box 924, Mbeya; Mbeya City; Tanzania

Information
- Type: Secondary school
- Motto: Let Education Light Our Way
- Religious affiliation: Catholic church
- Denomination: Sisters of St. Charles Borromeo
- Patron saint: St. Francis of Assisi
- School district: Mbeya Urban
- Education: Ordinary Level Secondary School.
- Oversight: Catholic Church in Tanzania Mbeya Archdiocese
- Headmistress: Sr. Veena Vas SCB
- Faculty: School offers the following subjects: Physics, Chemistry, Mathematics, Biology, Civics, History, Geography, Kiswahili, English and Bible Knowledge by observing the Tanzania Education System
- Grades: This is school offers Ordinaly level education, Form One up to Form Four (8th to 11th grade in Tanzania)
- Gender: Girls
- Language: English
- Campus type: Boarding School
- Colors: Green, Yellow, Red, Blue
- Sports: Football, Netball, Basketball, Handball
- Accreditation: Ministry of Education of the United Republic of Tanzania
- Affiliation: Certificate of Secondary Education Examination
- Alumni: St. Francis Girls' Secondary School Alumni
- Website: https://www.stfrancisgirlsmbeya.sc.tz

St Francis Girls' Secondary School is a Catholic secondary school for girls located in Mbeya, Tanzania. The school is owned by the Catholic Church in Mbeya Archdiocese, and is run by the Sisters of St. Charles Borromeo.

St Francis is one of the top-ranked schools in Tanzania, regularly performing well in Form Four Certificate of Secondary Education Examination (CSEE) results. Six out of the ten top Form Four students in 2019 were from St Francis. In 2020, the school dropped from first-ranked to second-ranked, though all students who sat for the exams passed. In 2021, "The Tanzania One" (the student with the highest CSEE score) came from St Francis, with 7 other St Francis students placing in the top 10.

== See also ==
- Catholic Church in Tanzania
- Education in Tanzania
- List of schools in Tanzania
