= Mungu Crater =

Crater of Arusha Region, Tanzania

Coordinates: 3.525°S 36.604°E

Mungu Crater is a volcanic crater in Oljoro ward and Mateves ward in Arusha Rural District located in Arusha Region, Tanzania. The crater is 1.22 km (0.76 mi) in diameter at its widest and 1,030 metres (1,130 yd) deep. Inside the crater is surrounded by forest whilst the crater floor is a seasonal swamp.
