= Olmotonyi =

Ward in Arusha Urban District, Arusha Region, Tanzania

- Ward
- Kata ya Olmotonyi
- Location within Tanzania
- Coordinates: 3.3138°S 36.6399°E
- Country: Tanzania
- Region: Arusha Region
- District: Arusha
- Elevation: 1,485 m (4,872 ft)

Population (2012)
  - Total: 18,560

Olmotonyi is a village and an administrative ward in the Arusha District Council located in the Arusha Region of Tanzania. According to the 2012 census, the ward has a total population of 18,560.
