= Loyola School, Dar es Salaam =

Coordinates: 6°48′51.18″S 39°13′49.92″E

Loyola High School Dar es Salaam
- Mabibo Farasi Ubungo District; Dar es Salaam; Tanzania

Information
- Type: Private, Catholic Coeducational secondary education institution
- Motto: Men and Women for Others
- Religious affiliation: Roman Catholic (Jesuit)
- Established: 1995; 31 years ago
- Grades: Secondary and A-level
- Enrollment: 1,050
- Color: maroon, white, grey
- Affiliations: DACASSA
- Website: LoyolaTanzania

Loyola High School is a private, Catholic, English-medium, secondary school run by the Eastern Africa Jesuit Province of the Society of Jesus in the Mabibo Farasi ward of Ubungo District, Dar-es-salaam Region, Tanzania. It was established in 1995 to provide a secondary and A-level education for students who were not selected for government schools.

Enrollment in 2006 was some 1,050 students, aged 12–18. Fifty percent of the children come from medium and low income families, most of whom are receiving education grants from non-governmental organisations including religious groups, such as the Jesuits. There are also on average two international Jesuit volunteers teaching at the school each year.

== Academics ==
Subjects taught at Loyola include bookkeeping, commerce, civics, physics, mathematics, chemistry, geography, English, history, economics, Kiswahili, biology, computer science, and accounting. A-levels are offered in physics, chemistry, biology, computer science, commerce, history, English, English literature, and geography, while advanced mathematics and accounting are taught at the A-level only. The school conducts continuous assessment tests each Monday to underscore its determination that its students excel although recently they have decided to introduce comprehensive examinations for students rather than the Monday continuous assessment tests that will be done twice every month at the beginning and at the end.

== Departments ==
The Students Government Council (SGC) through its 13 departments (although in most cases elected executive prefects can see through departments to eliminate or to add into the government if need arises) oversees all student activities and serves as an intermediary with the administration. Members are elected, with A-level students exercising the leadership.

The Clubs Department oversees about 23 clubs, divided into the academic, entertainment, and social categories. Academic clubs include Biology, Chemistry, Physics, Mathematics (Junior and Senior) and Quiz club. Entertainment clubs include Musical Instruments, Choir, and Modern Dance. Social clubs include African Union (AU), United Nations (UN), Home Craft, Scout. and Girl Guide. Club meetings are held between 2:00 pm and 3:00 pm each Friday. At the end of the year, clubs demonstrate what they have been doing and awards are presented to the top two clubs.

The Sports Department conducts an A-level league and a school league, with matches played at 3:00 pm on Fridays. The sports and games involved are: track and field, netball, basketball, football, volleyball, table tennis, and lawn tennis for both boys and girls.

The Academic Department mainly conducts quizzes and debates, group discussions, and career guidance meetings.

The Formation Department works with the dean of students to create an environment where students are self-disciplined and respectful of others.

The Entertainment Department enables students to display their talents like singing, dancing, modelling, acting, designing, and playing instruments, within the school and in inter-school fests.

The English Policy Department oversees and fosters the use of English on campus, at times conducting its own debates, quizzes, and writing competitions.

The Class Prefects Department includes 66 students who assist the teachers in achieving orderliness, and also might report student grievances to the heads of student government.

The Girls’ Academic Department deals with issues in a way that serves the special needs of female students. An all-female day at school each January allows girls and the women on the faculty to exhibit and nurture their special talents, potentials, and abilities.

The Health and Cafeteria Department encourages healthy eating behavior for the breakfast and lunch meals served at the school.

The Information Department is mainly a conduit of information between the administration and the students, and is most visible at the Tuesday and Friday assemblies.

The Environment and General Cleanliness Department alerts the school community to environmental issues and conducts an Environmental and Health Day each April.

== See also ==
- List of schools in Tanzania
- School Day 24: UK-Tanzania
