= Saint Mary Goreti Secondary School =

Location
- near Moshi; Tanzania; 3°20′8.5″S 37°20′48.1″E

Information
- Type: Non-governmental secondary school
- Religious affiliation: Catholicism
- Patron saint: Our Lady of Kilimanjaro
- Established: 1999 (27 years ago)
- Forms: 1–4, 5–6
- Enrollment: 1,100
- Language: English
- Website: stmarygoreti.com

Saint Mary Goreti Secondary School is a Catholic secondary school, located near Moshi town, in the Kilimanjaro Region of Tanzania.

Females make up about 97% of the students, while the remaining are the male population. The school is a property of the Catholic Church as are many institutions in the country and run by religious sisters. Its core goal is to create a better future for women in African society.

== Academics ==
The school offers both O-level and A-level education.

== See also ==
- Education in Tanzania
- List of schools in Tanzania
