= Sambasha =

Ward in Arusha Rural District, Arusha Region, Tanzania

- Ward
- Kata ya Sambasha
- Location within Tanzania
- Coordinates: 3°17′35.8″S 36°40′24.3″E
- Country: Tanzania
- Region: Arusha Region
- District: Arusha
- Elevation: 2,564 m (8,412 ft)

Population (2012)
  - Total: 9,484

Sambasha is a village and an administrative ward in the Arusha District Council located in the Arusha Region of Tanzania. According to the 2012 census, the ward has a total population of 9,484.
