= Mwandeti =

Ward in Arusha Rural District, Arusha Region

- Ward
- Kata ya Mwandeti
- Country: Tanzania
- Region: Arusha Region
- District: Arusha Rural District

Population
  - Total: 17,390

Mwandeti is an administrative ward in the Arusha Rural District of the Arusha Region of Tanzania. According to the 2002 census, the ward has a total population of 14,643.
