= St Mary's Mbeya Secondary School =

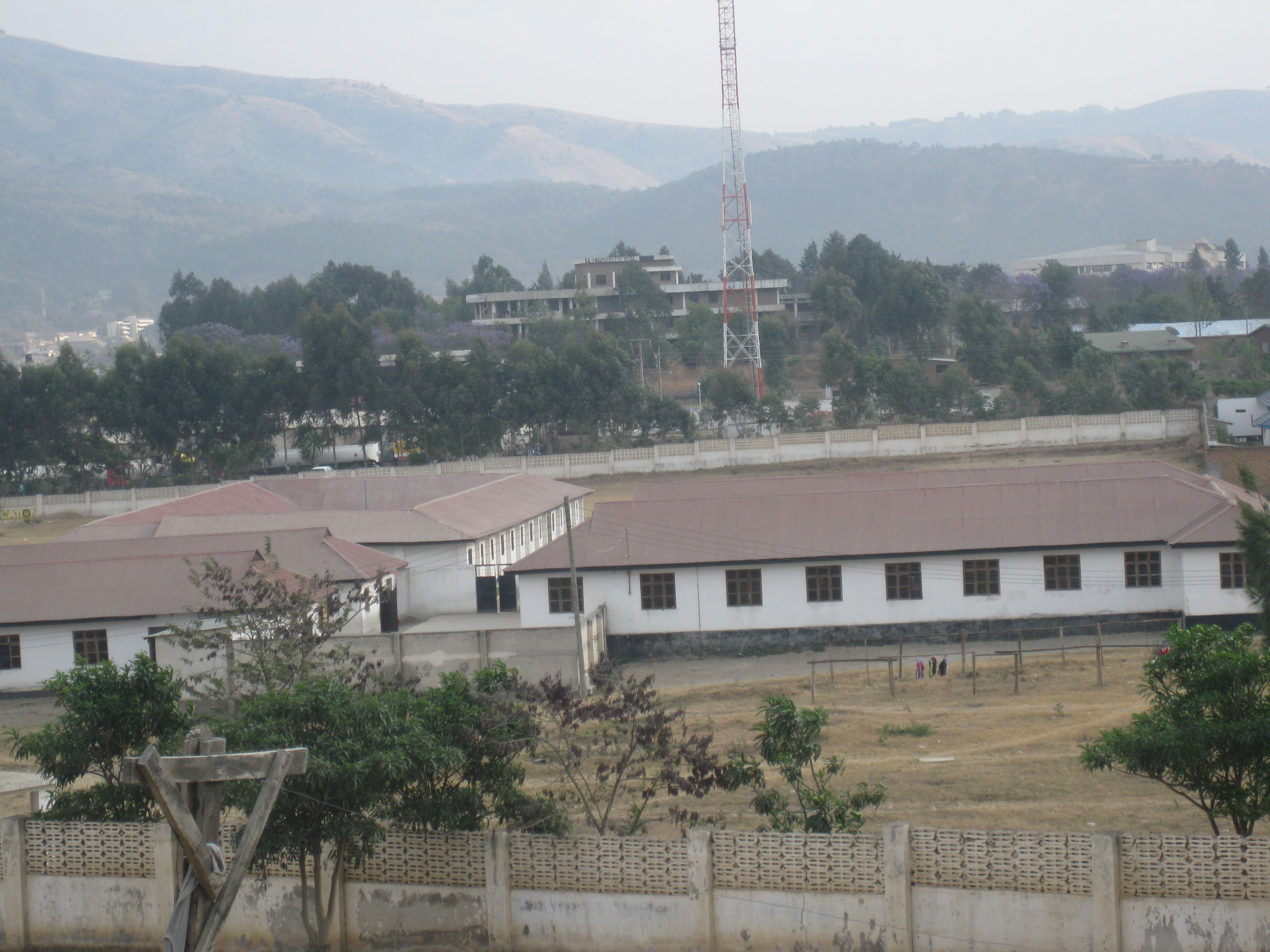
- Aerial view of the school

Location
- Mbeya; Tanzania; 8.9121°S 33.4413°E

Information
- Type: Coeducational
- Established: 2005 (21 years ago)
- Website: stmarysmbeya.ac.tz

St Mary's Mbeya Secondary School (SMMSS) is a school in Mbeya, Tanzania, located on the Tanzania-Zambia Highway.

It serves students from the Tanzania Southern Highlands, Dar Es Salaam, Morogoro, Arusha, and Iringa regions. Students also attend from Malawi and Zambia.

The school is a branch/campus of the St Mary's International Schools in Tanzania, founded by Hon. Rev. Dr. Gertrude Rwakatare, a senior bishop and co-founder (in 1995) of the Mikocheni Assemblies of God church at Mikocheni, Dar es Salaam.

Though founded in 2005 as a girls' boarding school, the school is now coeducational. Instruction is in English.

The school enrolls students in form one for a four-year course leading to the award of the Certificate of Secondary Education Examination (TZ). It has a wide variety of subjects with graduate teachers and also has well-stocked science and computer laboratories, staffed by qualified personnel. Intakes are from November of every year at the premises.

== See also ==
- Education in Tanzania
- List of schools in Tanzania
