= Goba Secondary School =

Public school in Ubongo District, Dar es Salaam

Coordinates: 6.733304°S 39.173636°E

- Goba ward, Ubungo District; Dar es Salaam Region; Dar es Salaam; Tanzania

Information
- Type: Public
- Established: 2006
- School number: S3928

Goba Secondary School is a public secondary school located in Goba ward of Ubungo District in Dar es Salaam Region, Tanzania. It is located at Kinzudi street about 7 km from Bagamoyo mainroad at Tangibovu.
