= Oltrumet =

Ward in Arusha Rural District, Tanzania

- Ward
- Kata ya Oltrumet, Wilaya ya Arusha
- Location within Tanzania
- Coordinates: 03°18′08″S 36°36′50″E
- Country: Tanzania
- Region: Arusha Region
- District: Arusha Rural District

Population (2012)
  - Total: 10,226

Oltrumet is an administrative ward in the Arusha District of the Arusha Region of Tanzania. The name of the ward is from a Maasai word meaning a place of grazing. According to the 2012 census, the ward has a total population of 10,226.
