= Kiranyi =

Ward in Arusha Rural District, Tanzania

- Ward
- Location within Tanzania
- Coordinates: 03°21′20″S 36°40′57″E
- Country: Tanzania
- Region: Arusha Region
- District: Arusha Rural District

Population (2012)
  - Total: 25,469

Kiranyi is an administrative ward in the Arusha Rural District of the Arusha Region of Tanzania. According to the 2012 census, the ward has a total population of 25,469.
