= Oljoro =

Ward in Arusha Rural District, Tanzania

- Ward
- Kata ya Oljoro
- Location within Tanzania
- Coordinates: 03°34′16″S 36°39′36″E
- Country: Tanzania
- Region: Arusha Region
- District: Arusha Rural District

Population (2012)
  - Total: 7,896

Oljoro is an administrative ward in the Arusha Rural District of the Arusha Region of Tanzania. The ward is home to Mungu Crater which is 1,030 meters deep. According to the 2002 census, the ward has a total population of 7,896
