= Omar Mussa (footballer, born 2000) =

Belgian footballer

Personal information
- Full name: Omar Mussa
- Date of birth: 20 August 2000 (age 26)
- Place of birth: Belgium
- Height: 1.84 m (6 ft 0 in)
- Position: Midfielder

Team information
- Current team: Sutton United
- Number: 14

Youth career
- –2019: KV Mechelen

Senior career*
| Years | Team | Apps | (Gls) |
| 2019 | Walsall | 1 | (0) |
| 2020–2021 | Dover Athletic | 8 | (0) |
| 2021–2022 | Weymouth | 34 | (1) |
| 2022–2024 | Dagenham & Redbridge | 39 | (3) |
| 2024–2025 | Torquay United | 40 | (2) |
| 2025–2026 | Wealdstone | 25 | (1) |
| 2026– | Sutton United | 0 | (0) |

International career^{‡}
| 2017 | Belgium U18 | 2 | (0) |
| 2023– | Burundi | 6 | (0) |
- * Club domestic league appearances and goals as of 12:08, 9 June 2026 (UTC) ‡ National team caps and goals as of 09:00, 25 September 2025 (UTC)

Omar Mussa (born 20 August 2000) is a professional footballer who plays as a midfielder for National League club Sutton United. Born in Belgium, he plays for the Burundi national team.

== Club career ==
After playing youth football for KV Mechelen, Mussa signed for English club Walsall in January 2019. He was released by Walsall at the end of the 2018–19 season, having made one Football League appearance for the club.

On 26 October 2020, Mussa joined National League club Dover Athletic, after appearing in pre-season for the Kent side. The following day, Mussa came off the bench in the 75th minute of a 3–2 victory over Eastleigh to make his debut for the club. Following's Dover's decision to not play any more matches in the 2020–21 season, made in late January, and subsequent null and voiding of all results, on 5 May 2021 it was announced that Mussa was out of contract and had left the club.

On 11 August 2021, Mussa joined another National League side, Weymouth, ahead of the 2021–22 season. A first career goal for Mussa came in October 2021 when he scored the only goal in a victory over King's Lynn Town. After the match, Weymouth's manager Brian Stock came out and said that he had not "seen a player with his amount of ability".

On 4 July 2022, Mussa signed for National League side Dagenham & Redbridge for an undisclosed fee. He spent two years at the club before being released in May 2024.

On 26 July 2024 he joined Torquay United.

On 22 July 2025, he joined National League side Wealdstone. He made 34 appearances for the club, before departing at the end of the 2025–26 season.

On 24 June 2026, Mussa joined fellow National League club Sutton United.

== International career ==
Born in Belgium, Mussa is of Burundian descent. He was a Belgian under-18 international, making 2 appearances in 2017. He debuted with the Burundi national team in a friendly 3–1 loss to Indonesia national team on 25 March 2023.

== Personal life ==
Mussa's father, also named Omar Mussa, was a professional Burundian footballer who played in Belgium.

== Career statistics ==
=== Club ===
As of 2 June 2026

Appearances and goals by club, season and competition
| Club | Season | League | | | FA Cup | | League Cup | | Other | | Total | |
| Club | Season | Division | Apps | Goals | Apps | Goals | Apps | Goals | Apps | Goals | Apps | Goals |
|---|---|---|---|---|---|---|---|---|---|---|---|---|
| Walsall | 2018–19 | League One | 1 | 0 | 0 | 0 | 0 | 0 | — | | 1 | 0 |
| Dover Athletic | 2020–21 | National League | 8 | 0 | — | | — | | 1 (Note: Appearance (s) in FA Trophy) | 0 | 9 | 0 |
| Weymouth | 2021–22 | National League | 34 | 1 | 2 | 0 | — | | 1 | 0 | 37 | 1 |
| Dagenham & Redbridge | 2022–23 | National League | 25 | 1 | 3 | 1 | — | | 2 | 1 | 30 | 3 |
| Dagenham & Redbridge | 2023–24 | National League | 14 | 2 | 1 | 0 | — | | 0 | 0 | 15 | 2 |
| Dagenham & Redbridge | Total | | 39 | 3 | 4 | 1 | — | | 2 | 1 | 45 | 5 |
| Torquay United | 2024–25 | National League South | 40 | 2 | 1 | 0 | — | | 4 (Note: Three appearances in FA Trophy, one appearance in National League South play-offs) | 0 | 45 | 2 |
| Wealdstone | 2025–26 | National League | 25 | 1 | 2 | 1 | — | | 7 (Note: Includes National League Cup and FA Trophy) | 0 | 34 | 2 |
| Career total | | | 147 | 7 | 9 | 2 | 0 | 0 | 15 | 1 | 171 | 10 |

=== International ===
As of match played 10 June 2025

Appearances and goals by national team and year
| National team | Year | Apps | Goals |
|---|---|---|---|
| Burundi | 2023 | 3 | 0 |
| Burundi | 2025 | 3 | 0 |
| Total | | 6 | 0 |

== Honours ==
Wealdstone

- FA Trophy runner-up: 2025–26
