= Braeside School (Nairobi) =

Co-ed, international day school in Kenya

Location
- Muthangari Road, Lavington, Nairobi; Kenya; 1°17′12″S 36°45′57″E

Information
- Type: Private international school
- Established: 1994
- Oversight: Braeburn Group of International Schools
- Head teacher: Wallen Nyamota
- Years: 1 to 13
- Age range: 3—18
- Education system: British National Curriculum
- Website: braeside.braeburn.com

Braeside School is a co-educational international day school in Lavington, Nairobi, Kenya. It is one of the Braeburn Group of International Schools. The school is open to students of all religions, races, cultures, and nationalities.

== Overview ==
The Braeside School opened in 1994 as a primary school and has now developed into a full-fledged learning institution offering academic programs based on the British National Curriculum. Classes cover Early Years and Primary School, with a high school leading to IGCSE examinations located on the same campus.

The Braeside campus is located in the up-market area of Lavington, near the Lavington Green shopping centre along Muthangari Road.

Braeside School has a music room; 2 libraries; a 25-metre swimming pool and a training pool; 3 science laboratories; playing fields; a kitchen; a dining hall which also caters for indoor games; classrooms for each teaching group; an assembly hall able to fit 300 people seated and a sick bay. Textbooks and stationery are provided.

The school is divided into the Early Years Unit, catering for children aged 2–5 years, and the Primary School.

== Schools ==
=== Early Years Unit ===
In the Early Years Unit, children aged 2 years may start school part-time and build up to staying for lunch and afternoon sessions, using school transport if required. Children encounter additional activities such as music; ICT; PE and Swimming; library time; pet-keeping; role play and cooking.

=== Primary school ===
In Braeside Primary School, lessons are divided into core subjects – English, Mathematics and Science – and foundation subjects – History, Geography, Physical Education (PE), Art, Music, Foreign Languages, Information Communication Technology (ICT), Religious Education (RE) and Personal, Social and Health Education (PSHE). Teaching is a combination of whole class, group and individual teaching with more specialised teaching in the subject areas of I.C.T., French or Kiswahili, R.E., Swimming, P.E. and Music/Drama.

Years 1 to 6 are tested at the middle and end of each term, and at the end of the academic year. Years 2 and 6 sit Standard Assessment Tests (SATs) in May. Homework is set. At the end of every term, performance and conduct reports are given to parents or guardians.

==== Extra-curricular activities ====
All children experience team games, athletics and swimming, and play sports. There are teams that play competitively with other Nairobi Schools during the academic year (the school has teams in soccer, basketball, netball, rounders, hockey and swimming). Sports Days and Swimming Galas are key events in the school year, as are Inter-House competitions and Inter-School competitions.

There is a pastoral system – in which School Prefects are an integral part – to teach responsibility and respect. A learning support programme works with individual students or small groups within a class or year group.

Braeside School offers activities either as a lunchtime or after-school activity. These cover sporting, musical and creative activities. Some activities involve weekend commitments such as sports, swimming fixtures and outdoor education. The school Scout movement has represented both the School and country in international Jamborees. School clubs include Creative Arts, Needlework, Indoor Games, Dancing, Karate, Ballet, Horse Riding, Debating and Wildlife.

==== Tours and meets ====
School students are taken out on educational visits as part of their learning. An Outdoor Education programme, for students from Year 1 to Year 6, has been designed to encourage independence and teamwork. The programme builds on student's experiences and provides opportunities for fieldwork. In addition to local tours, the school organises an international trip each year. Students have visited South Africa, France, Great Britain and The Netherlands.

As well as parent-teacher interviews, curriculum evenings are arranged throughout the year to explain aspects of the curriculum.

== Administration and enrolment ==
Students travel to school by car or may take advantage of the school's Safety Buses. Each bus has a particular route, which allows the majority of Nairobi to be covered by a convenient route. The qualified school nurse provides first aid for minor injuries and takes responsibility for administering prescribed medicines.

Students may start at Braeside School in the Early Years Unit, from 2 to 5 years of age. Year 1 starts the September following a child's 5th birthday. Entry is preferred at the start of the academic year, but students may enroll throughout the academic year.

== See also ==
- List of schools in Kenya
