= Omar Mussa (footballer, born 1980) =

Burundian footballer

Personal information
- Full name: Omar Mbanza Mussa Rukundo
- Date of birth: 18 November 1980 (age 45)
- Place of birth: Bujumbura, Burundi
- Height: 1.83 m (6 ft 0 in)
- Position: Centre forward

Senior career*
Years	Team	Apps	(Gls)
1997–2000	Saint Louis		
2000–2001	Berkenbos	25	(11)
2001–2003	Antwerp	69	(13)
2003–2004	Al-Wakrah		
2004–2006	Patro Eisden Maasmechelen	1	(0)
2006	Ronse	0	(0)
2006–2007	KRC Mechelen	0	(0)
Total		95	(24)

International career
2003	Burundi	1	(0)
- * Club domestic league appearances and goals

Omar Mbanza Mussa Rukundo (born 18 November 1980) is a Burundian former professional footballer who plays as a centre forward.

== Career ==
Born in Bujumbura, Mussa played club football for Saint Louis, Berkenbos, Antwerp, Al-Wakrah, Patro Eisden Maasmechelen, Ronse and KRC Mechelen.

He also earned one cap for the Burundi national team in 2003.

== Personal life ==
Mussa's son, also called Omar Mussa is also a professional footballer.
