= Braeside School (Highland Park, Illinois) =

- U.S. National Register of Historic Places
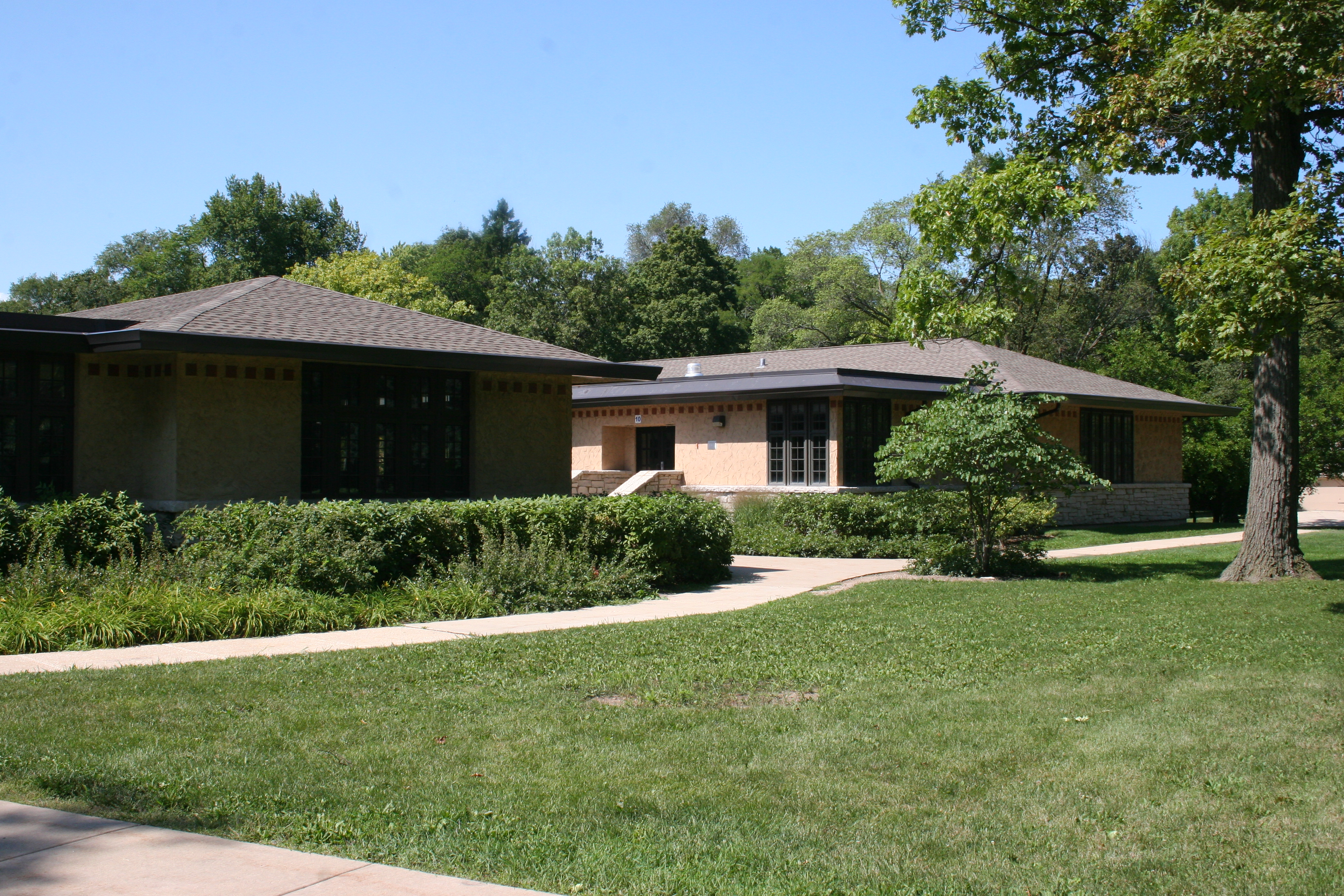

- Location within Chicago metropolitan area Location within Illinois Location within the United States
- Location: 150 Pierce Rd., Highland Park, Illinois
- Coordinates: 42°09′19″N 87°46′19″W
- Area: 5 acres (2.0 ha)
- Built: 1928
- Architect: John S. Van Bergen
- Architectural style: Prairie School
- MPS: Highland Park MRA
- NRHP reference No.: 82002555
- Added to NRHP: September 29, 1982

Braeside School is a historic school at 150 Pierce Road in Highland Park, Illinois. Built in 1929, the Prairie School style school was designed by architect John S. Van Bergen. Van Bergen had worked for Frank Lloyd Wright and mainly designed Prairie School houses, including his own Highland Park home. His plan for the school focused on creating a home-like setting for students, which included large classrooms, natural lighting, and fireplaces. The school has a low, horizontally oriented shape with a hip roof, a characteristic Prairie School form.

The school was added to the National Register of Historic Places on September 29, 1982.
