= Moivo =

Ward in Arusha Rural District, Arusha Region

- Ward
- Kata ya Moivo
- Country: Tanzania
- Region: Arusha Region
- District: Arusha Rural District

Population
  - Total: 27,151

Moivo is an administrative ward in the Arumeru district of the Arusha Region of Tanzania. According to the 2002 census, the ward has a total population of 20,562. The ward is the second most populous ward in the district after Sokon II.
