= Mwanza International School =

Coordinates: 2.5281697°S 32.892867°E

Location
- Capri Point; Mwanza; PO Box: 700; Tanzania

Information
- Gender: Co-educational
- Age: 3 to 15/16
- Founded: 2012
- MoE No.: EM.17629
- Website: www.mwanzainternational.org

Mwanza International School is a primary and secondary school teaching the National Curriculum for England (Cambridge) to local and expatriate children in Mwanza, Tanzania. The school was founded in 2012 by Barry and Ruth Clement and is situated on the Capri Point promontory overlooking the shores of Lake Victoria.
