= Bwawani =

Ward in Arusha, Tanzania

- Ward
- Kata ya Bwawani
- Location within Tanzania
- Coordinates: 03°39′10″S 38°01′59″E
- Country: Tanzania
- Region: Arusha Region
- District: Arusha Rural District

Population (2012)
  - Total: 11,117

Bwawani is an administrative ward in the Arusha Rural District of the Arusha Region of Tanzania. According to the 2012 census, the ward has a total population of 11,117.
