= Bangata =

Ward in Arusha, Tanzania

- Ward
- Kata ya Bangata
- Location within Tanzania
- Coordinates: 03°19′43″S 36°44′49″E
- Country: Tanzania
- Region: Arusha Region
- District: Arusha Rural District

Population (2012)
  - Total: 9,136

Bangata is an administrative ward in the Arusha Rural District of the Arusha Region of Tanzania. According to the 2012 census, the ward has a total population of 9,136.
