= Arusha District Council =

Arusha District Wilaya ya Arusha (Swahili)
- District of Arusha
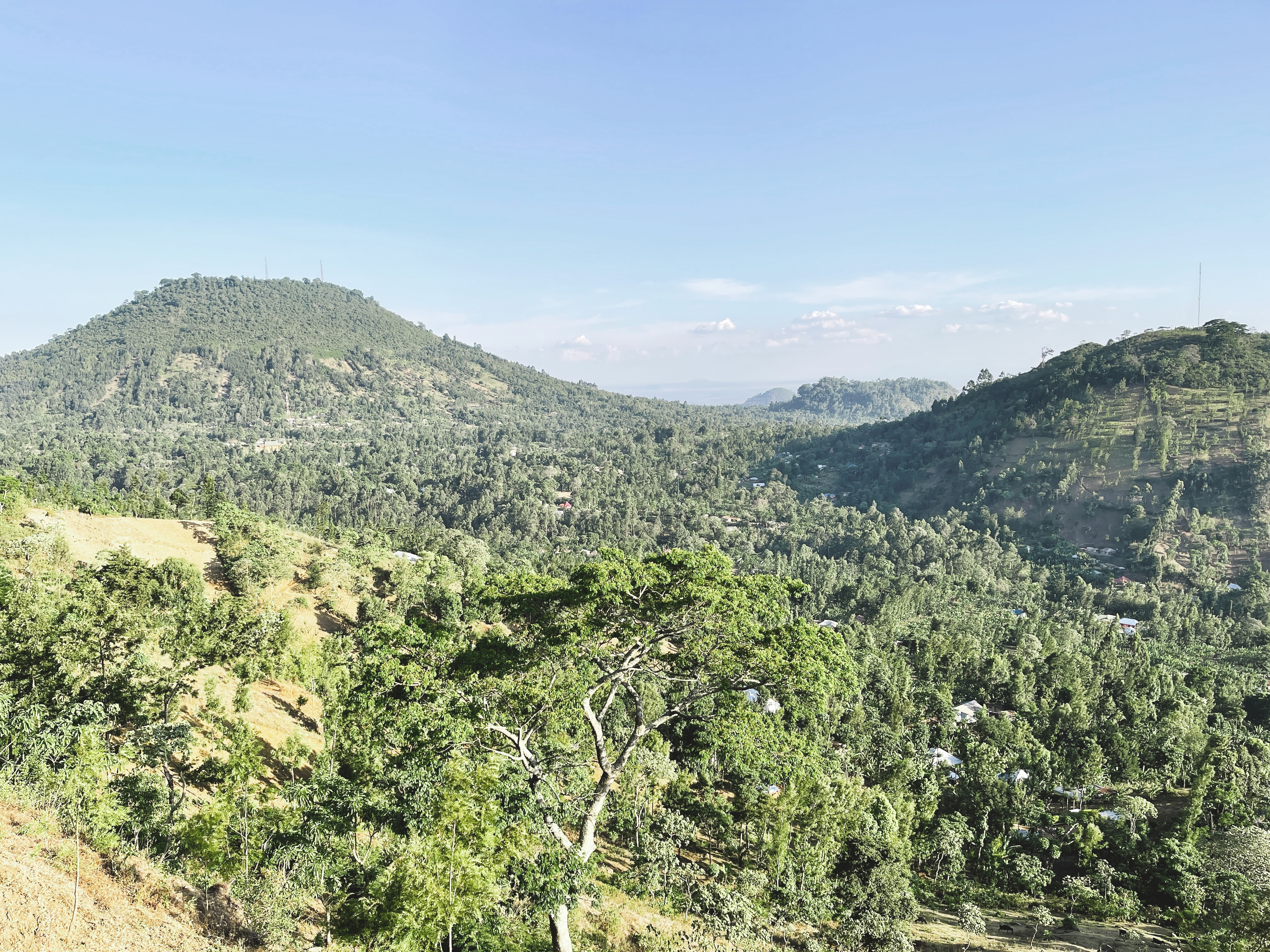
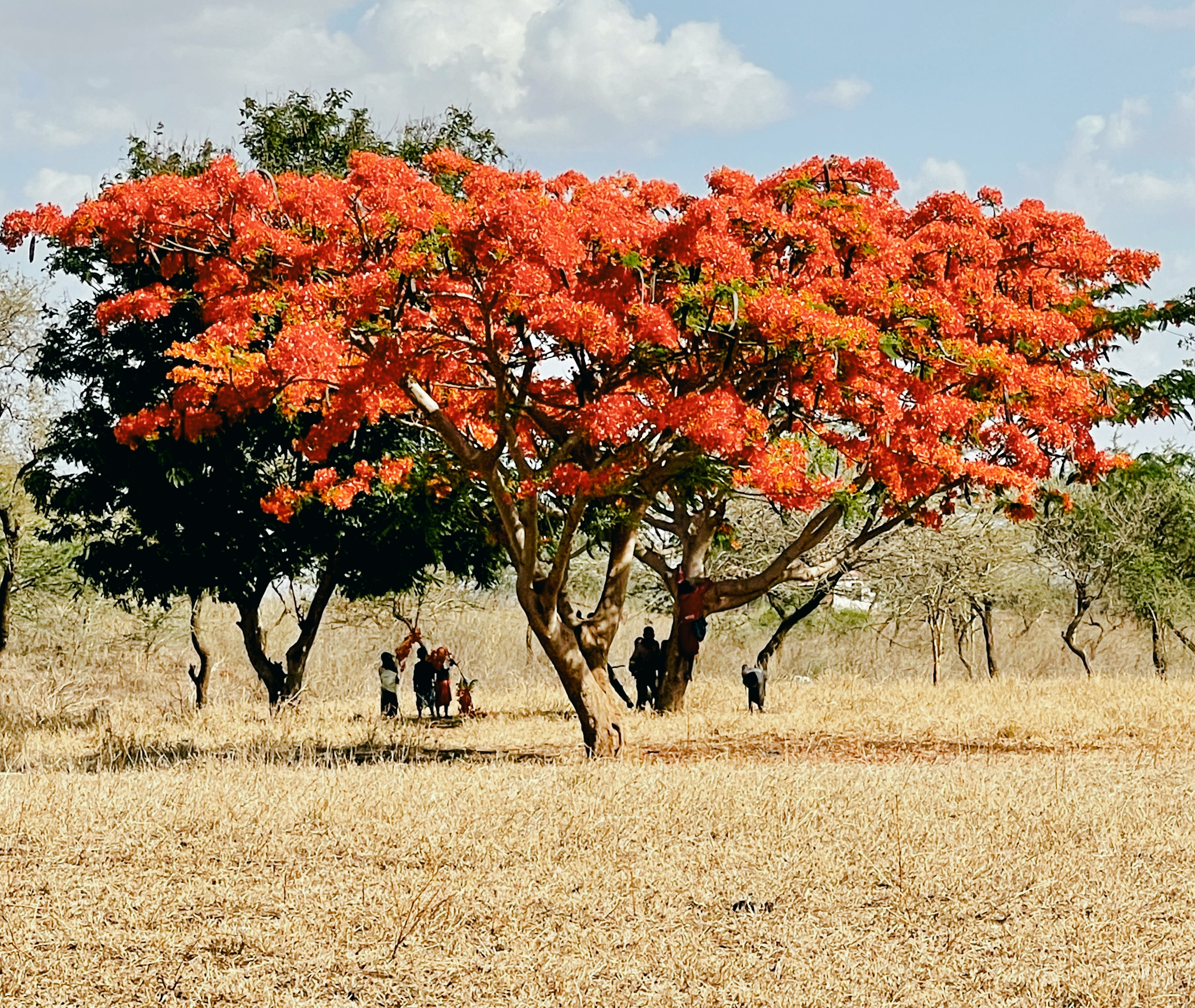
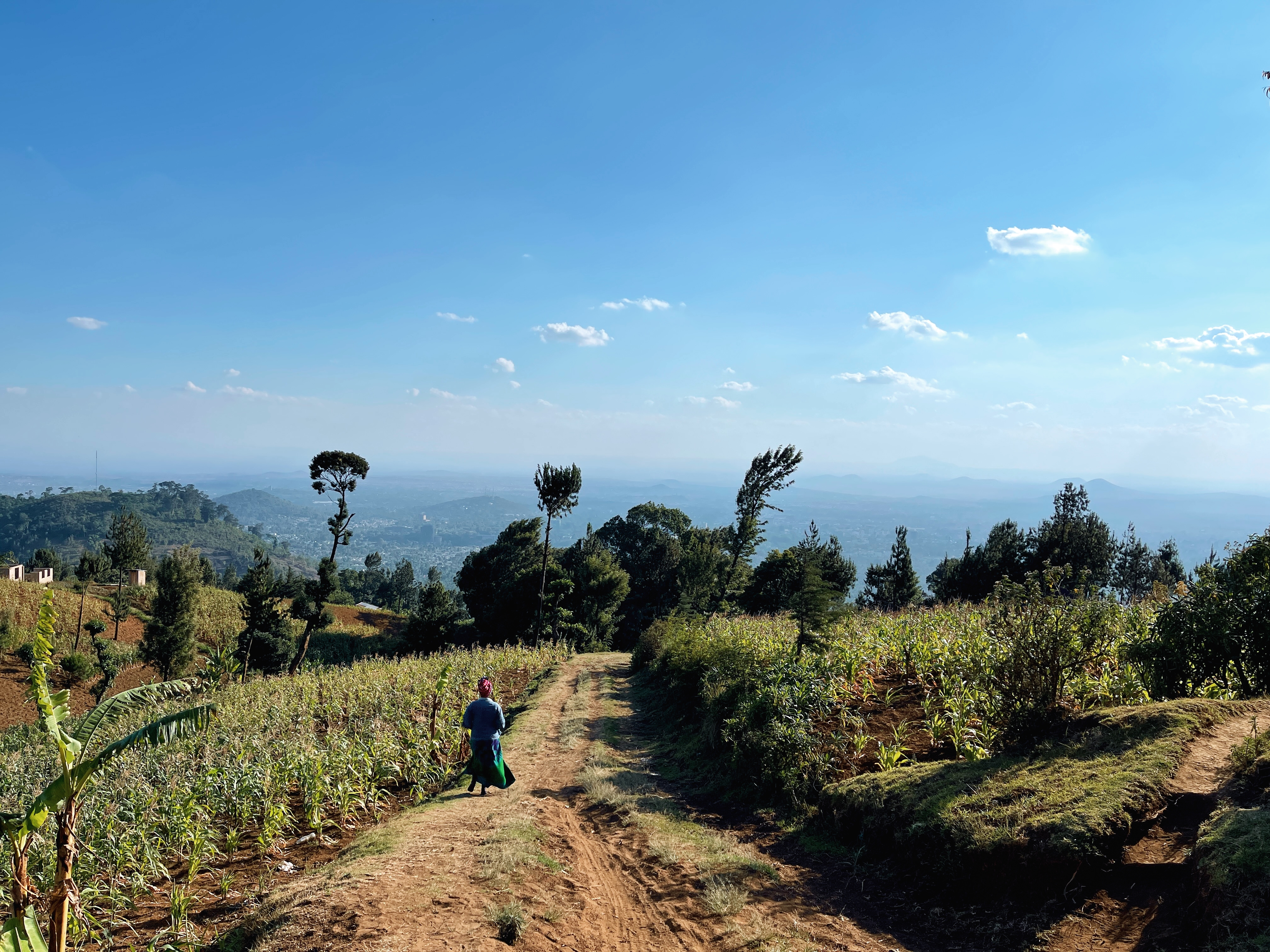
- From top to bottom: Sokon II view, flame trees in Mateves Ward, and Oltroto Ward
- Nickname: Arusha's breadbasket
- Arusha Rural District's location within Arusha Region
- Coordinates: 03°15′38″S 36°38′28″E
- Country: Tanzania
- Region: Arusha Region
- District: 1 July 2007
- Named for: Arusha people
- Capital: Sokon II

Area
  - Total: 1,547.6 km^{2} (597.5 sq mi)
  - Rank: 6th in Arusha
- Highest elevation (Mount Meru Peak): 4,562 m (14,967 ft)

Population (2022)
  - Total: 449,518
  - Density: 290.46/km^{2} (752.29/sq mi)
- Demonym: District Arushan

Ethnic groups
  - Settler: Maasai, Chaga, Pare & Swahili,
  - Native: Rwa & Arusha people
- Time zone: UTC+3 (EAT)
- Postcode: 232xx
- Website: Official website
- Symbols of Tanzania
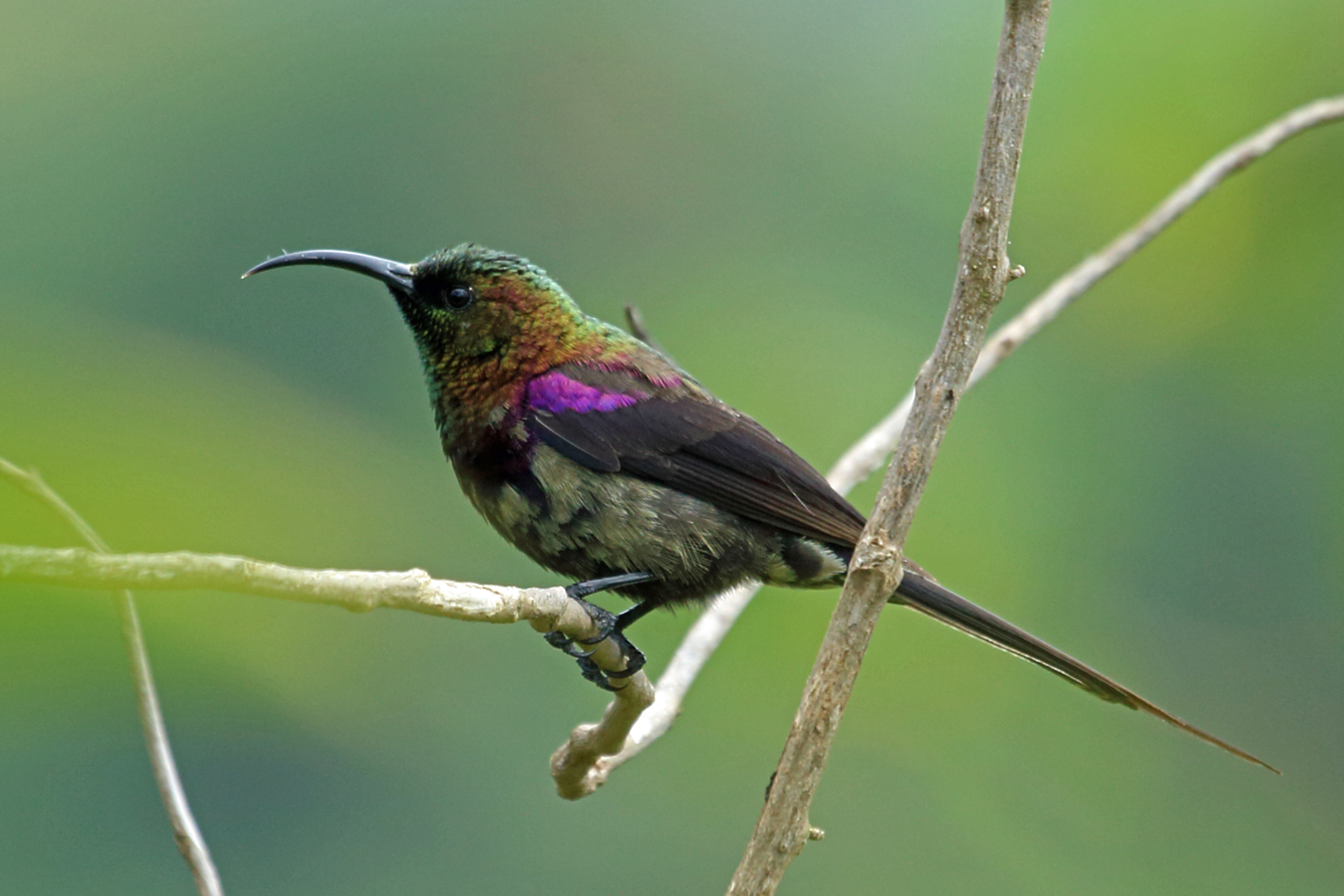
- Bird: Tacazze sunbird

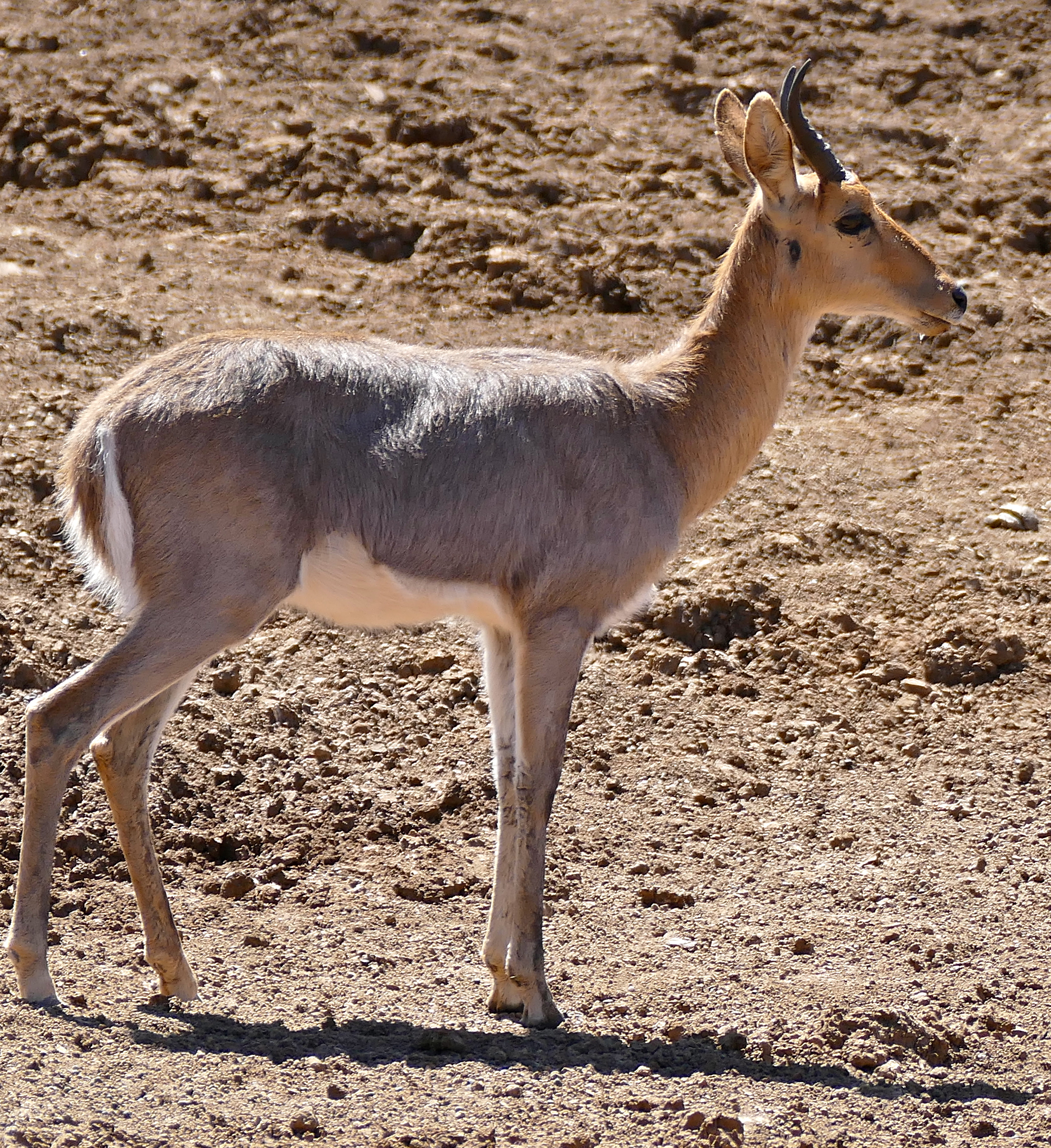
- Mammal: Mountain reedbuck

Arusha District or Arusha District Council (Wilaya ya Arusha , in Swahili) is one of the seven districts of the Arusha Region of Tanzania. The district is bordered to the north by Longido District, to the east by Meru District, to the south by Kilimanjaro Region, and to the west by Monduli District. the district surrounds Arusha City on all three sides. The district covers an area of 1,547.6 km^{2} (597.5 sq mi). The district is comparable in size to the land area of Guadeloupe. The district capital is located in Sokon II. According to the 2022 Tanzania National Census, the population of Arusha District was 449,518.

== History ==
Arusha District was first home of the now extinct Koningo people, hunter gather group that lived around the slopes of Mount Meru for centuries. Around 400 years ago, Arusha people a bantu subgroup of the Pare people migrated from Arusha Chini in Kilimanjaro Region. Some Masai in the west assimilated into the Arusha community and influenced the Arusha into adopting the Masai language as their own. In 1880s a pandemic of rinderpest killed thousands of cattle and forced a large section of the Masai people in the west and integrated into Arusha agriculturally based society. Arusha District Council was formed on July 1, 2007. The previous Arumeru District Council has separated into Arusha District Council and Meru District Council.

== Geography ==
There are two zones, one of which being the green belt of Mount Meru's slopes to the south. Annual rainfall ranges from 800mm to 1000mm. The other zone is in the lowlands belt, where maize, beans, cassava, peas, rose, pigeon peas agriculture are grown, and cattle keeping done on a free ranch.

== Economy ==
=== Infrastructure ===
Paved Trunk road T2 from Kenyan border crossing at Kamanga to Moshi and paved trunk road T5 from Babati to Arusha pass through Arusha Rural District.

=== Agriculture ===
As Arusha's breadbasket, a total of 78,350 ha of arable land is available in the district. Maize, beans, coffee, pyrethrum, round potatoes, sweet potatoes, bananas, legumes, and horticultural crops are among the food and cash crops farmed in the district.

=== Industry ===
TARPO Industries (T) LTD and TIGAAT East Africa LTD are two medium-sized businesses. Mateves is one of Arusha District Council's 27 Wards, and it is extremely close to a big scale enterprise known as 'A to Z Net Healthy Olyset,' which deals with treated mosquito net manufacturers. There are also 76 small scale industries, such as carpentry, saw mills, garages, milling machines, workshops, tomato/chill source parking, and book printers.

=== Tourism ===
The district has Mungu Crater (Laroi Crater). Napuk Falls is also in Kiutu ward. Bagata ward is home to Ngires Falls.

== Demographics ==
The district's ethnic population is largely made up of Arusha people, who moved there roughly 400 years ago. Other settle groups, especially Europeans, have established themselves in Mateves ward. The district in 2012 had a population of 323,198 people, with 154,301 males and 168,897 females, a population density of 227.4 people per square mile, and a population growth rate of 3.4%. According to the 2012 national Population and Housing Census report, the average family size is five people, and the average life expectancy is 52 years.

== Administrative subdivisions ==
As of 2012, Arusha Rural District was administratively divided into three divisions: Enaboishu; Moshono; Mukulat; and 27 wards.

=== Wards ===
- Bangata
- Bwawani
- Ilkiding'a
- Kiranyi
- Kisongo
- Kimnyaki
- Mlangarini
- Moivo
- Mussa
- Mwandeti
- Nduruma
- Olasiti
- Olkokola
- Oldonyosambu
- Oljoro
- Olmotonyi
- Oloirien
- Oltroto
- Oltrumet
- Sambasha
- Mateves
- Kisongo
- Sokon II

== Sources ==
- Arusha District Council on Arusha Region website
