= Irente School for the Blind Girls =

Schools for the blind in Tanzania

Coordinates: 4.80°S 38.29°E

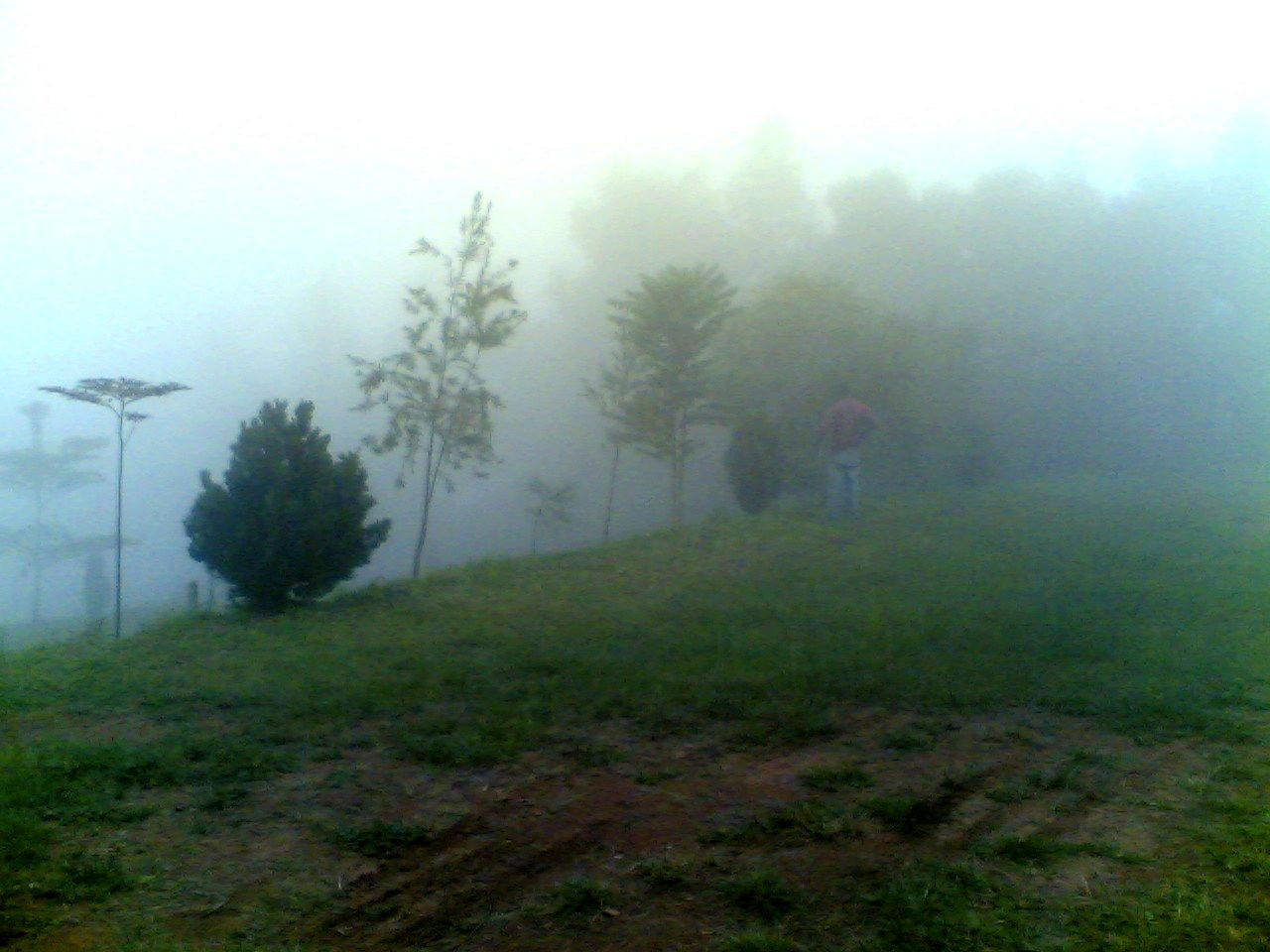
- Irente covered in a blanket of fog
- Lushoto; Tanzania

Information
- Religious affiliation: Lutheranism
- Established: 1963; 62 years ago

Irente School for the Blind Girls was founded in 1963 by the Lutheran Church in the Usambara Mountains in Lushoto, Tanzania. It is a small residential/primary school. Subjects include craft training and agriculture.
