= Lushoto =

- Town
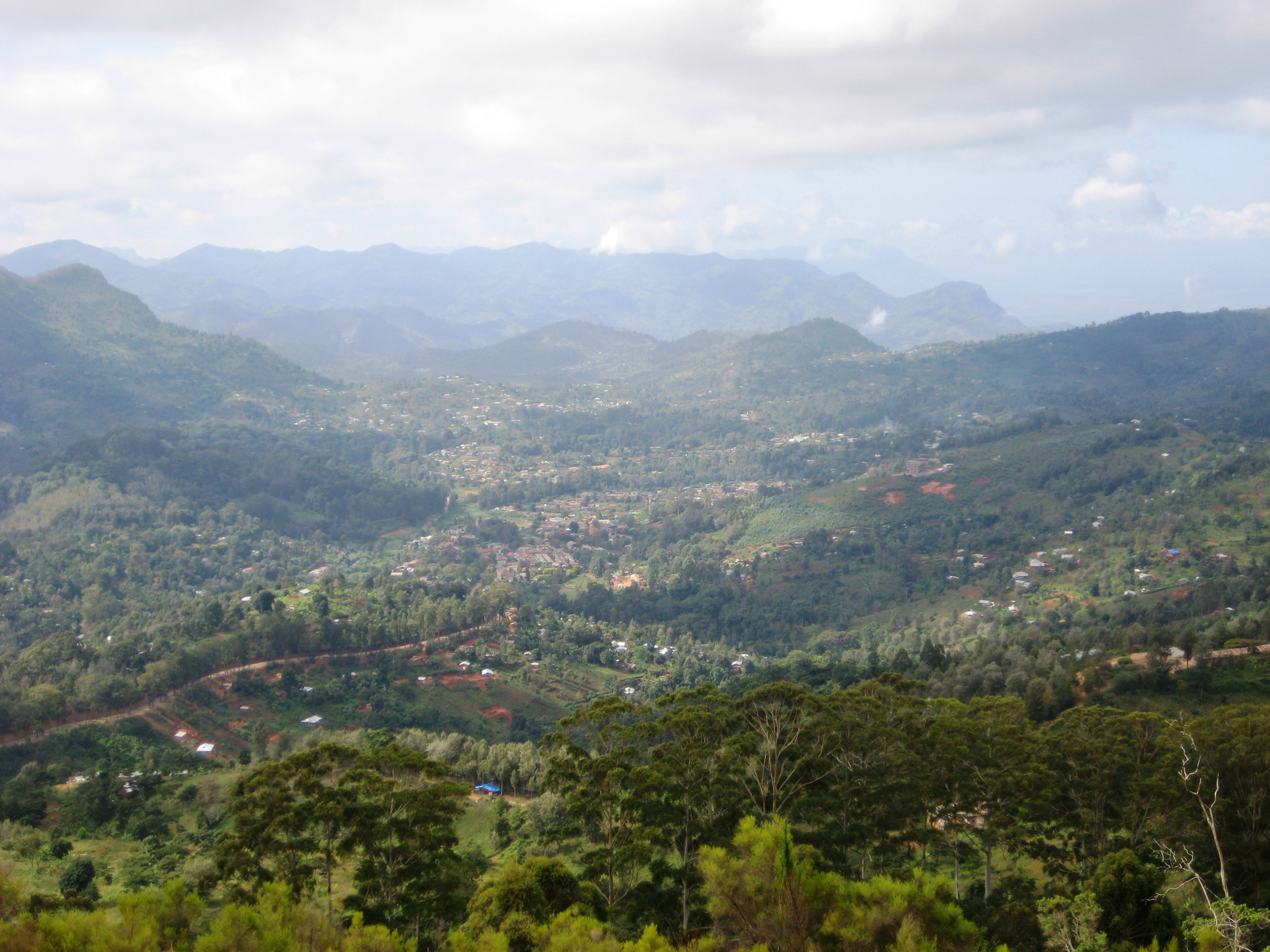
- An aerial view of Lushoto.

- Location of Lushoto Lushoto (Africa)
- Coordinates: 04°47′34″S 38°17′28″E
- Country: Tanzania
- Region: Tanga Region
- District: Lushoto District

Population (2022 census)
  - Total: 34,000
- Time zone: GMT + 3

Lushoto is a town in the Usambara Mountains of Tanzania. It is the capital of Lushoto District, Tanga Region. The 2012 national census estimated the population of Lushoto ward at 28,190.

The Irente School for the Blind Girls is located in Lushoto, built by the Lutheran Church in 1963.

== History ==
During German colonial rule, Lushoto was known as Wilhelmstal (William's Valley) and was named after Emperor Wilhelm II. The German politician, Kai-Uwe von Hassel was born here in 1913.
