= Mlangarini =

Ward in Arusha Rural District, Tanzania

- Ward
- Kata ya Mlangarini
- Location within Tanzania
- Coordinates: 03°26′01″S 36°46′06″E
- Country: Tanzania
- Region: Arusha Region
- District: Arusha Rural District

Population (2012)
  - Total: 12,983

Mlangarini is an administrative ward in the Arumeru district of the Arusha Region of Tanzania. According to the 2012 census, the ward has a total population of 12,983.
