= Mussa, Tanzania =

Ward in Arusha District, Arusha Region

Mussa Ward Kata ya Mussa (Swahili)
- Ward
- Kata ya Mussa
- Location within Tanzania
- Country: Tanzania
- Region: Arusha Region
- District: Arusha Rural District

Area
  - Total: 71.60 km^{2} (27.64 sq mi)
- Elevation: 1,571 m (5,154 ft)

Population (2012)
  - Total: 11,836
  - Density: 165.3/km^{2} (428.1/sq mi)

Mussa is an administrative ward in the Arusha Rural District of the Arusha Region of Tanzania. The ward covers an area of 71.60 km^{2} (27.64 sq mi), and has an average elevation of 1,571 m (5,154 ft). According to the 2012 census, the ward has a total population of 11,836.
