= FPCT Tumaini Secondary School =

Location
- Mpanda, Katavi; Nduwi Katumba

Information
- Motto: Fear for the Lord is the Beginning of Knowledge (Kumcha Bwana ni chanzo cha Maarifa)
- Religious affiliation: FPCT Katumba Main Polish
- Founded: 2005
- Headmaster: Mr. Kadangi

FPCT Tumaini Secondary School, is the private school located in the Southern part of Tanzania in Katavi region, formerly Rukwa Region.

The school was established in 2005 by the Free Pentecostal Church of Tanzania under the Manager, archbishop of the Katumba Parish Rev. Jonathan Kidebuye. The school now serves large number of population in Tanzania especially people from Lake zone regions: Mwanza, Shinyanga, Bariadi, Kagera, and Mara, central zone regions of Tabora, Dodoma and Singida. It is accommodates a large number of people from the Southern zone Regions of Tanzania. The school is about 31 Kilometers from Katavi capital Town of Mpanda.

== School Motto ==
The Motto of the school is Fear for the Lord is the Beginning of the Knowledge (Kumcha Bwana ni chanzo cha Maarifa), the school other than preparing the students academically it as well prepares them spiritually, every student based on his/her religion.
