= Olorieni =

Ward in Arusha Rural District, Arusha Region, Tanzania

- Ward
- Kata ya Oloreini
- Location within Tanzania
- Coordinates: 03°19′0″S 36°37′59″E
- Country: Tanzania
- Region: Arusha Region
- District: Arusha

Population (2012)
  - Total: 22,434

Olorieni is a village and an administrative ward in the Arusha District Council located in the Arusha Region of Tanzania. In 1978 the population was 2,480 and according to the 2012 census, the population had increased to 22,434.
