= Braeburn Schools =

International group of British-curriculum schools in East Africa

Braeburn Schools Ltd
- Trade name: Braeburn Schools; Braeburn Group of International Schools
- Type: Private company
- Industry: International school-based education
- Founded: 1979; 47 years ago in Nairobi, Kenya
- Founder: Terry Childs and Eden Jacob
- Headquarters: Nairobi, Kenya
- Areas served: Kenya, Tanzania, South Africa
- Key people: Mukesh Shah (Chair); Terry Childs (Chief Executive); Andy Hill (Managing Director)
- Subsidiaries: Braeburn Schools Tanzania Limited
- Website: braeburn.com

Braeburn Schools, officially Braeburn Schools Limited or alternatively the Braeburn Group of International Schools, is an international privately owned educational management company headquartered in Nairobi, Kenya. Established in 1979, the group operates schools across Kenya and Tanzania. Braeburn schools offers the English national curriculum, International Baccalaureate (IB), BTEC diploma programmes, and teacher training.

== History ==
Braeburn Schools was founded in 1979 by British educator Terry Childs, beginning with the establishment of Braeburn School on Gitanga Road, Lavington in Nairobi. The school was designed to offer the English national curriculum to both expatriate and Kenyan students, providing an alternative to the local 8–4–4 system.

During the 1980s and 1990s, the group opened Braeburn Garden Estate School (1982) and Braeside School (1994). In 1999, Braeburn acquired St. George's International School in Arusha, Tanzania, marking its first venture outside Kenya. In 2007, the company established a Tanzanian subsidiary, Braeburn Schools Tanzania Limited, to manage operations in the region.

As of 2025, Braeburn operates eleven schools across East Africa.

== Governance ==
Braeburn Schools Limited is managed as a private educational company.

- Chairman: Mukesh Shah
- Chief Executive Officer: Terry Childs
- Managing Director: Andy Hill

Each campus operates under a local headteacher and board, while group-wide policies and standards are managed from the Nairobi headquarters.

== Campuses ==
As of 2025, the Braeburn Group manages the following schools:

| School name | City | Country | Age range | Year established/acquired | Notes |
|---|---|---|---|---|---|
| Braeburn School (Gitanga Road) | Lavington, Nairobi | Kenya | 3–18 | 1979 | Original Braeburn campus; offers IGCSE and A Levels |
| Braeburn Garden Estate School | Garden Estate, Nairobi | Kenya | 2–18 | 1982 | Initially an unfinished nursery; later expanded into a 10-hectare boarding campus |
| Braeside School | Lavington, Nairobi | Kenya | 2–18 | 1994 | Began under the 8–4–4 system, later converted to the English curriculum |
| Braeburn Nanyuki International School | Nanyuki | Kenya | 2–13 | 2008 | Formerly the Podo School |
| Braeburn Mombasa International School | Shanzu, Mombasa | Kenya | 2–18 | 2004 | Introduced A Levels in 2005 |
| Braeburn Kisumu International School | Kisumu | Kenya | 2–16 | 2006 | Expanded from primary to full-year education |
| Braeburn Imani International School | Thika, Nairobi area | Kenya | 2–18 | 2010 | Built on former Del Monte Foods land |
| Braeburn School, Arusha | Arusha | Tanzania | 2–18 | 1999 | Former St George’s International School; A Levels introduced in 2005 |
| Braeburn Arusha Main Campus, Kisongo | Kisongo, Arusha Region | Tanzania | 2–18 | 2007 | Operates under Braeburn Schools Tanzania Limited |
| Braeburn Dar es Salaam International School | Mbezi Juu, Dar es Salaam Region | Tanzania | 2–16 | 2013 | Offers Early Years to Year 11 |

== See also ==
- Education in Kenya
