= Ilkiding'a =

Ward in Arusha Rural District, Tanzania

Ilkiding'a Ward Kata ya Ilkiding'a (Swahili)
- Ward
- Nickname: "The gathering place"
- Location within Tanzania
- Coordinates: 03°16′21″S 36°43′57″E
- Country: Tanzania
- Region: Arusha Region
- District: Arusha Rural District

Population (2012)
  - Total: 10,850

Ilkiding'a is an administrative ward in the Arumeru district of the Arusha Region of Tanzania. Ikiding'a means a gathering place in Masai language. According to the 2012 census, the ward has a total population of 10,850.
