= Kisongo =

Ward in Arusha Rural District, Tanzania

- Ward and Town
- Kata na Mji wa Kisongo
- Location within Tanzania
- Coordinates: 03°12′05″S 36°24′55″E
- Country: Tanzania
- Region: Arusha Region
- District: Arusha Rural District

Population (2012)
  - Total: 8,769

Kisongo is an administrative ward and small town in the Arusha Rural District of the Arusha Region of Tanzania. According to the 2022 census, the ward has a total population of 12,519. It is located in the outskirts of Arusha, about 7 km west of Arusha Airport. The word Kisongo comes from one of the four major Masai Clan families, Kiputiei, Loitai, Purko and Kisongo.

There are numerous local churches, dispensaries and schools in Kisongo. Kisongo Academic College (KAC) is a co-educational institution that is divided into two branches: KAC Secondary School and KAC Department of Tourism and Conservation Training (DTC). Braeburn Arusha School is an international school that provides Early Years, primary and secondary education, following the National Curriculum for England. The Saint Joseph Girls High School, Arusha Modern High School (owned by the Catholic Archdiocese) and St. Joseph University Arusha Campus are also located in Kisongo.

In January 2014, a 130-acres piece of land allocated to the East African Community (EAC) by the Government of the United Republic of Tanzania was inspected for future expansion. The EAC Secretariat intends to initiate grand development projects on the land that will include staff housing scheme, international school, health centre, recreational facilities, exhibition ground, and banking as well as a shopping mall.
