= Al Muntazir School =

Coordinates: 6.8018°S 39.2873°E

The Al Muntazir Schools Dar es Salaam
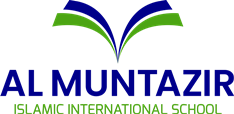
- Dar es Salaam; Tanzania

Information
- Type: International School
- Motto: Committed To Excellence
- Established: 1986
- Grades: K - Year 13
- Enrollment: over 4500
- Language: English
- Accreditation: CIE and ISO
- Website: https://almuntazir.sc.tz

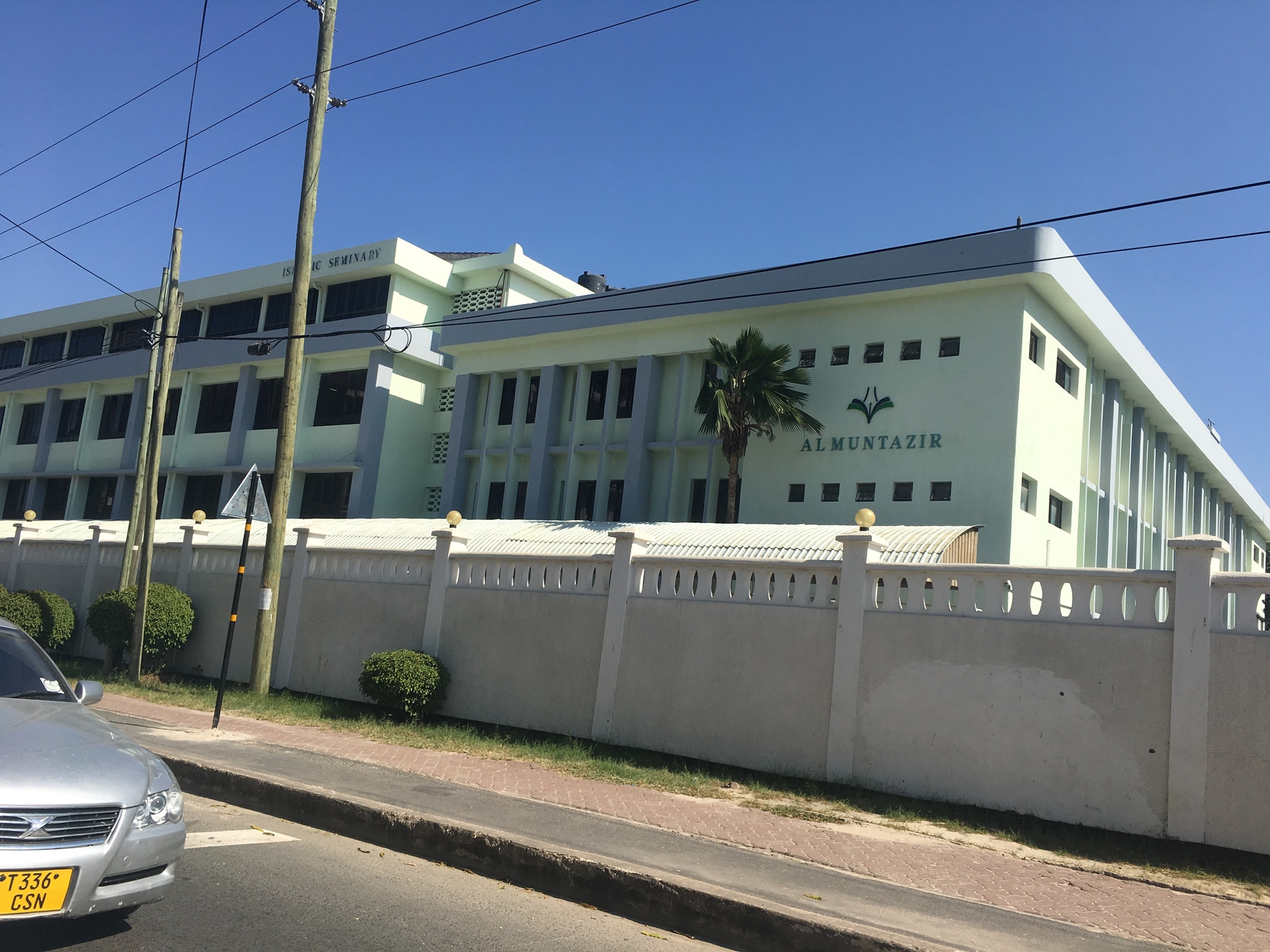
Al Muntazir Schools, Dar es Salaam, June 2019.

Al Muntazir School, named after the Shia Twelfth Imam, is a collection of non-government schools, providing education from pre-school to A-levels, in Dar es Salaam, Tanzania. It was founded and is run by the Khoja Shia Ithna'sheri Jamaat (KSIJ), Central Board of Education (CBE).

The network includes campuses such as Al Muntazir Secondary, Al Muntazir Boys and Girls Primary Schools, Al Muntazir Nursery, and Al Muntazir Special Education Needs School, located across different areas of the city.

== Campuses ==
=== Al Muntazir Secondary ===
Established in 1986, the school is home to approximately 1000+ students and 80+ teaching faculty, and offers the Cambridge Assessment International Education (CAIE) Curriculum from Lower Secondary to A Level.

=== Curriculum ===
Al Muntazir Secondary is authorized by the Cambridge Assessment International Education (CAIE – UK) to offer the Cambridge Lower Secondary, Cambridge IGCSE and Cambridge GCE A Level programs for ages 12 – 18.

Secondary School uses Cambridge Lower Secondary, IGCSE and GCE A Level.

Years 7 to 9 (Lower Secondary)

Year 10 & 11 (IGCSE)

Year 12 & 13 (Post 16 – A levels)

=== Extracurricular Activities ===
Students are currently registered for clubs such as

- Mathematics Club
- Badminton
- Editorial club
- Kiswahili Club
- Farsi Club
- Table tennis
- Model United Nations (MUN)
- Kickboxing
- Environmental Club
- Young scientists club
- Community service
- Swimming
- Basketball club
- Throwball
- Cooking club
- Football club
- Cricket club

=== Facilities ===
School Library:2 libraries are available(1 per wing)

Science Laboratories: A total of six science labs are available(3 per wing)

IT Laboratories: Two IT Labs are available(1 per wing)

Sports Ground The school has access to the Union Sports Club Sports ground for sporting activities such as football, volleyball, cricket, squash, and swimming

=== Al Muntazir Boys Primary ===
The Al Muntazir Boys Primary, formerly known as Al Muntazir Junior School, is situated on Sea View Road opposite the Aga Khan Hospital. It currently follows the 6 year program on Cambridge Primary Curriculum.

=== Extracurricular Activities ===
Students can enroll in clubs such as

- Quiz Club
- Bookworm Club
- Board Games: Scrabble, Math fun, etc.
- Kiswahili Drama Club
- Mathematics
- Qur'an Hifz/Arabic
- Arts and crafts (knitting, drawing, etc.)
- Environmental Club
- Young Journalist Club

Sporting activities available are; Basketball&Karate

=== Al Muntazir Girls Primary ===
Al Muntazir Girls Primary is situated on the United Nations Road, next to the Selandar Bridge. The campus was established in 2002, branching out from the Al Muntazir Junior School as a two-floored open rectangle. It consists of offices and classrooms, as well as extra facilities such as an art room, a library, a computer room, a moral science room, a resource room, and a sick bay where children are taken care of by the school nurse. The curriculum offered is Cambridge Primary.

=== Al Muntazir Nursery ===
The Al Muntazir Nursery provides education to about 740 students aged between 2/2 and 6 years. It currently offers Early Years Foundation Stage (EYFS) program, supporting children's development from

=== Al Muntazir Special Education Needs (SEN) ===
Located on Charambe Street, this campus caters to students with special needs, including those with Autism, Down syndrome, and cerebral palsy.

== Academic Performance ==
Al Muntazir Schools have a strong record of academic achievement. In the 2024 Cambridge examinations, students excelled across all levels: IGCSE learners achieved high marks in Mathematics, Sciences, and Languages; AS Level students performed well in their chosen subjects; and A-Level graduates secured impressive results, with many gaining admission to reputable universities both in Tanzania and abroad. With an average Division I rate of 89.3%, the schools are considered among the leading private institutions in Dar es Salaam.

== See also ==
Dar es Salaam
