= Lavington, Nairobi =

Neighbourhood in Nairobi

Lavington
- Location of Lavington in Kenya
- Coordinates: 01°16′50″S 36°46′10″E
- Country: Kenya
- County: Nairobi City
- Sub-county: Westlands

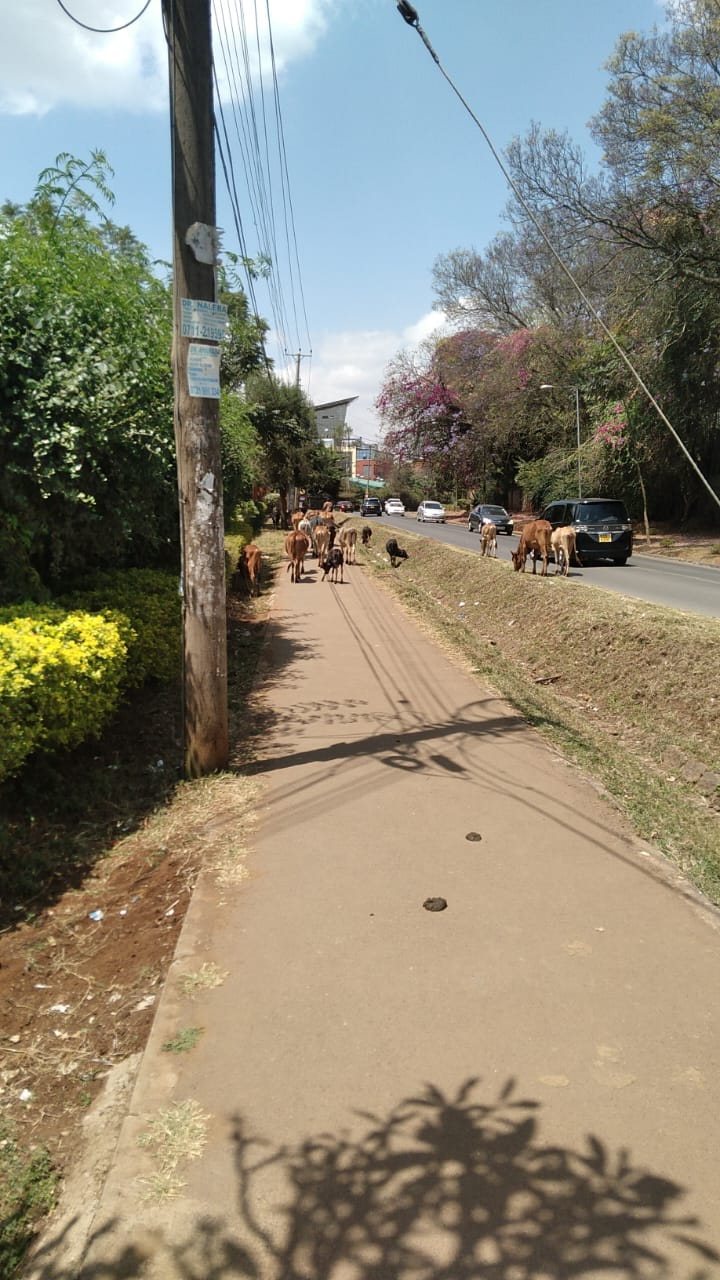
Lavington along James Gichuru Road.

Lavington is a residential suburb of Nairobi. Located within the sub-county of Westlands, it is approximately 5.5 km (3.4 mi) northwest of the central business district. It is a neighbourhood that hosts the upper middle class to upper class segment of Nairobi residents. It is a low to medium-density residential neighbourhood. The bulk of the area now known as Lavington was originally the St Austin's Mission established by the French Holy Ghost Fathers.

The Kirichwa tributary of the Nairobi River runs through the community.

== Background ==
The Strathmore School, Saint Mary's School, Loreto Convent School, St. Austin's Academy, Braeside High School, Nairobi International School, Braeburn High School, Lavington Primary School and Rusinga School are located in Lavington.

The area is also known for the Lavington Green Shopping Centre which has a supermarket, a bar/restaurant called Kengeles, and a number of smaller stores. The neighborhood is also home to the Jaffery Sports Club Ground.

While Lavington is yet to see large-scale construction of residential highrises like the nearby upmarket estates of Kileleshwa and Kilimani, the Nairobi County Government has signaled that the estate is a priority area for future development.

The estate is increasingly home to some of Nairobi's most popular upmarket bars, restaurants, and nightclubs.
