= Alphaxard Lugola =

Tanzanian politician

Honourable Alphaxard Kangi Lugola MP
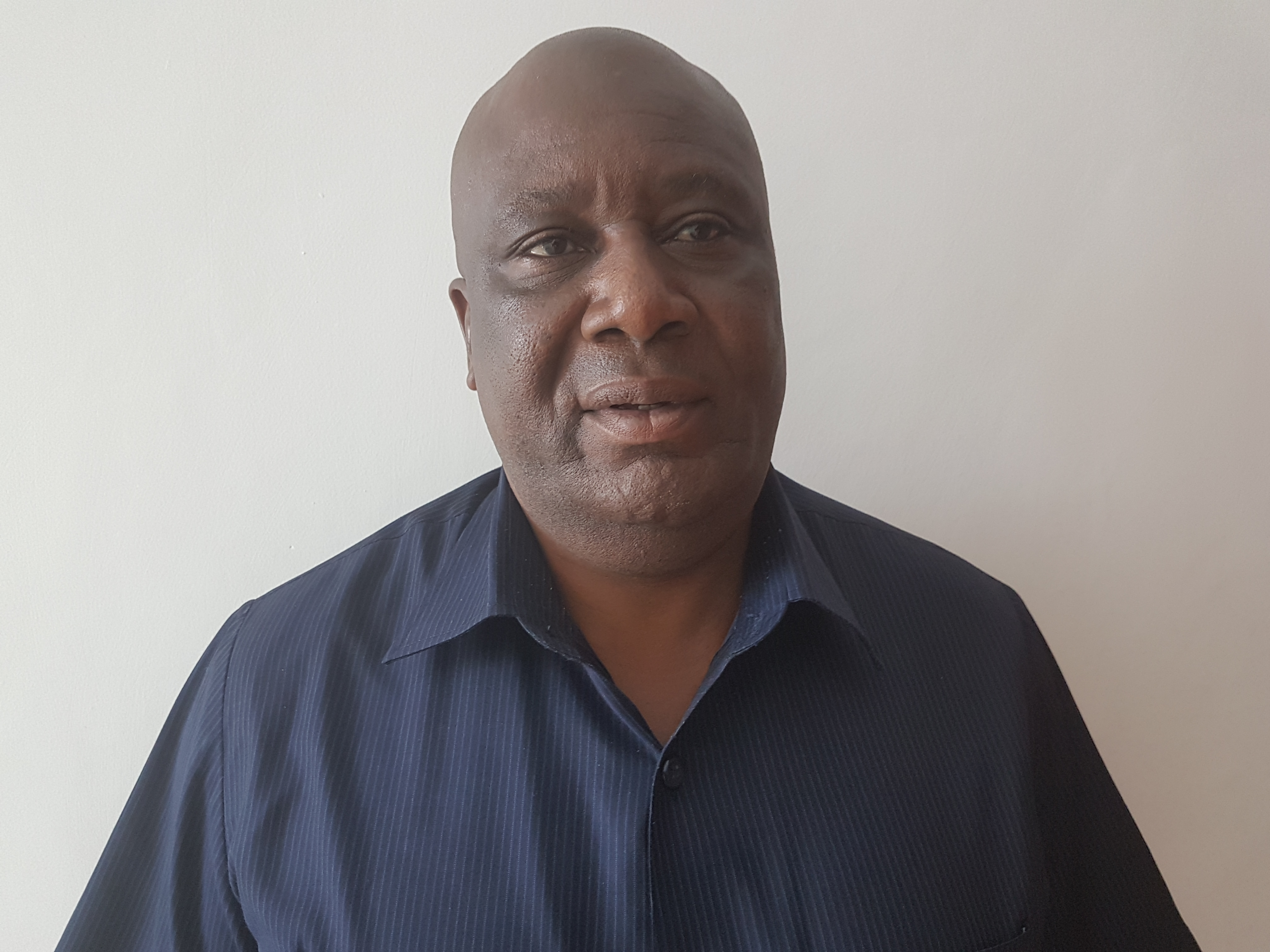

Minister of Home Affairs
- In office 1 July 2018 – 23 January 2020
- President: John Magufuli
- Preceded by: Mwigulu Nchemba
- Succeeded by: George Simbachawene

Deputy Minister of State in the Vice President's Office for Union and Environment
- In office 9 October 2017 – 1 July 2018
- Minister: January Makamba

Member of Parliament for Mwibara
- Incumbent
- Assumed office November 2015

Personal details
- Born: 23 May 1963 (age 63) Bunda District, Mara Region, Tanganyika
- Party: CCM
- Education: Dar es Salaam University (Bachelor degree); University of Leicester (Postgraduate degree)

Alphaxard Kangi Ndege Lugola (born 25 May 1963) was a Tanzanian politician and current Member of Parliament for Mwibara constituency since 2010. He is also member of the ruling party Chama Cha Mapinduzi (CCM).

== Background and education ==
Kangi Alpaxard Lugola started his inclination process to schooling at Nyamitwebili Primary School from 1974 to 197, between 1978 and 1978 at Mugeta Primary School as he studied for one year before moved to Kavunjo Primary School where he completed his standard seven Education and being titled with PSLE that was between 1979 and 1980. In 1981 to 1984 he joined the Sengerema Secondary School until his completion the O level Education and to be awarded a CSEE but also in 1985 to 1987 he succeeded to complete his Advance Certificate of Secondary Education Examination at Songea Boys Secondary School. He joined the UDSM starting from 1988 to 1992 where awarded a certificate of bachelor's degree, and between 1987 and 1990 of Kangi Alpaxard Lugola join the University of Leicester in London and being awarded with a certificate of post graduate degree.

== Political career ==
Politician
Year	Position	Level
2015 – 2020	Member of parliament	The House of Parliament in Tanzania
2018 – 2020	Minister of home affairs	The ministry of home affairs
2015 - 2018	Member of Parliament (Mwibara)	The House of Parliament in Tanzania
2015 - 2018	Foreign Affairs, Security and Defense Committee	The House of Parliament in Tanzania
2013 - 2015	Standing Orders Committee	The House of Parliament in Tanzania
2010 - 2015	Member of Parliament (Mwibara)	The House of Parliament in Tanzania
2010 - 2013	The Parliamentary Public Organisation Accounts Committee	The House of Parliament in Tanzania
2008 - 2008	Chairman Parents CCM	At District
1986 - 1986	Chairman	CCM Branch
