= Hdif =

Hdif or HDIF may refer to:

- How Does It Feel to Be Loved?, a London night club
- How does it feel to be loved, which has numerous meanings
- Human Development Innovation Fund, a DFID challenge fund
