= NECTA =

NECTA may refer to:

- New England city and town area, a geographic and statistical entity in the United States
- National Examinations Council of Tanzania, the board which manages the Certificate of Secondary Education Examination
