= Jumanne Mhero Ngoma =

Tanzanian discoverer of Tanzanite gemstone

Jumanne Mhero Ngoma (1939 - January 2019) was a Tanzanian man who is credited for discovering the gemstone tanzanite.

== Biography ==
Jumanne Mhero Ngoma was born in the Same District, Kilimanjaro and relocated to the then-Arusha Region of Tanzania at an early age.

In January 1967, at the age of 28, Ngoma discovered tanzanite at the Mirerani hills in the Kiteto district of the then Arusha Region (presently Manyara Region). He claims that the initial analysis through the Tanzanian geological laboratory at the city of Dodoma identified the gemstone as a variety of the mineral zoisite. Three years later, he was issued with a certificate of recognition by then-Tanzanian president Julius Nyerere and a financial reward of Tsh 50,000 for his discovery. In 1984, he was given a certificate for the scientific discovery by the Tanzania Commission for Science and Technology.

Despite discovering the rare mineral and the subsequent industry, it was found that Ngoma and his family had lived a struggling life of poverty in 2018. In April 2018 (51 years since the discovery), then-President John Magufuli rewarded Ngoma 100 million Tanzanian shillings for his efforts in discovering the stone.
