= Digital Opportunity Trust =

Canadian charitable organization and social enterprise

Digital Opportunity Trust (DOT) is a Canadian non-profit organization that provides technology, entrepreneurship, and leadership training programs for young people around the world.

DOT’s headquarters are in Ottawa, Ontario, and it also has offices in Kenya, Rwanda, Tanzania, Ethiopia, Lebanon, Jordan, and the United Kingdom. Since its founding in 2001, DOT has trained three million young people in 25 countries, 70% of whom are women.

== History ==
DOT was established in 2001 by husband and wife team Janet Longmore and David Newing. Newing was a former commander in the British Royal Navy with a long history working in youth development in the UK and Canada. Longmore was the former CEO of Communities in Schools, an American nonprofit organization helping at-risk kids stay in school, and prior to that, worked as a truck driver, trade unionist, and educator in the mining sector in northern British Columbia.

The Longmore/Newing team got the idea to start a nonprofit organization that trained young people to deliver digital skills training to their peers when they were advising the U.N. on youth unemployment and the digital divide. They wanted to reverse what was an outdated development model of sending in experts from the outside to help young people in the Global South.

DOT’s first board of directors was headed by David Johnston, then the President of the University of Waterloo and later Governor General of Canada. The organization’s original funding came from American technology company Cisco, which provided a three-year grant to fund DOT’s first training programs in Jordan, Lebanon, and Egypt.

== Work ==
DOT primarily trains young entrepreneurs in parts of the world where formal sector unemployment is high. That includes countries in the Middle East, Africa, Eastern Europe, and East Asia, as well as indigenous communities in Canada. For example, DOT has offices in Jordan, where the youth unemployment rate is 42 percent, Lebanon, where the youth unemployment rate is 48 percent, and Rwanda, where 21 percent of youth are unemployed. According to Longmore, DOT believes business skills are a “path to self-reliance and self-sufficiency” for young people in these places.

DOT’s model is to train local youth, who then teach their own peers skills like digital marketing, financial management, and business development. The organization states it is working to close the digital divide between young people with access to technology skills and those without it, particularly young women. A World Bank study from 2016 showed that women entrepreneurs in Ethiopia who participated in a DOT training increased their profits by 30 percent a year later. The study found no evidence that the entrepreneurs had increased business knowledge, but they were more confident and dedicated.

Another study, conducted in Ethiopia in 2022, found that DOT’s trainings “offered unique services that filled critical gaps in Ethiopia’s entrepreneurship ecosystem,” especially around technological education for women. DOT has also been a sponsor of Miss Geek Africa, a competition in which young women from around Africa create apps to solve social problems.

DOT’s work has been funded by both public and private donors, including Cisco, the Mastercard Foundation, IBM, the Conrad N. Hilton Foundation, the Bill and Melinda Gates Foundation, Global Affairs Canada, and USAID. It has worked with the World Bank, UNICEF, UNDP, and UN Women. Its most recent major project, started in 2023, is a skills training program in Tanzania, Malawi, Zambia, and Cote D’Ivoire called Going Beyond, which is funded by the Mastercard Foundation.

DOT also participates in international meetings and alliances like the World Economic Forum and the Global Partnership for Effective Development Co-operation.
