= Ruth Medufia =

Ghanaian welder

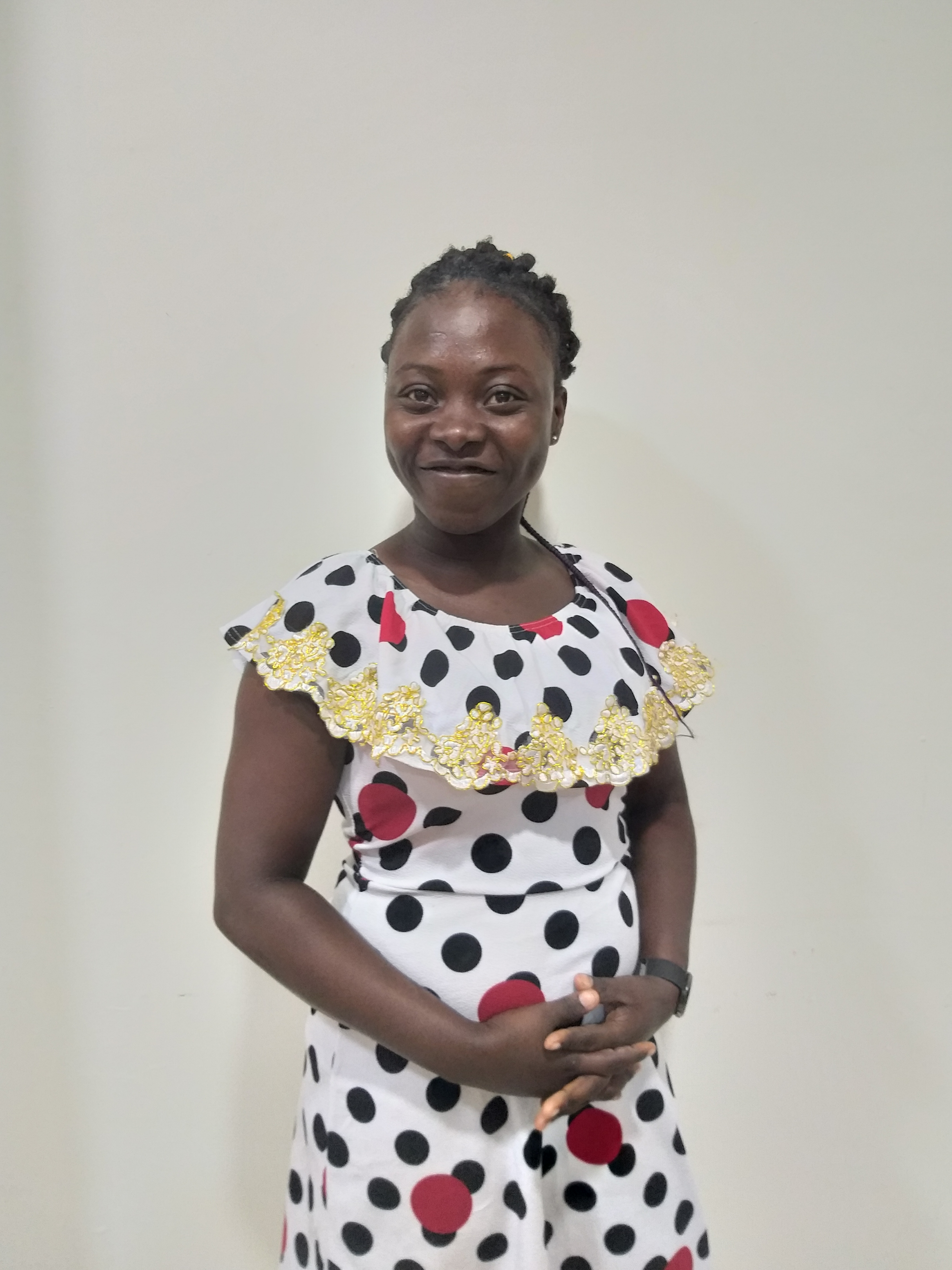

Ruth Medufia (Ghana, 1991 or 1992) is a welder from Sekondi - Takoradi in Ghana. In 2018, she was listed among BBC'S 100 most influential and inspiring women in the world (100 Women (BBC). Medufia, lives in a community with few possibilities and aims to be a model to follow young women in the construction industry.

== Career ==
Upon completion of senior high school, Medufia enrolled in the Youth Inclusive Entrepreneurial Development Initiative for Employment (YIEDIE), a Mastercard Foundation's Youth Forward initiative. This initiative seeks to train the youth including women to become qualified and licensed tradespeople especially in the area of construction, a growing industry in Ghana.
