= Challenge fund =

Scheme for competitive public funding

A Challenge Fund (also referred to as enterprise challenge fund) is a competitive financing facility to disburse donor funding for international development projects, typically utilizing public sector or private foundation funds for market-based or incentive driven solutions. As Irwin and Porteous (2005) observed, "In practice, the objective of a challenge fund is to provide the smallest possible financial contribution to a socially worthwhile project consistent with making it less risky and more financially sustainable to the private promoter." Applicant qualifications differ widely among challenge funds, but typically focus on non-state actors.

Typically, a donor agency (such as UK's Department for International Development (DfID), the Inter-American Development Bank (IADB), Swedish International Development Cooperation Agency (SIDA), and the Canadian International Development Agency (CIDA)) hires a development contractor (such as KPMG or Palladium International) to host the funding competition around a broader sector (such as food trade, agriculture, or education in a specific geography) to solicit innovative proposals that otherwise may not be discovered through more traditional grant-making or funding mechanisms. Alternatively, challenge funds are often used as ways to address what development partners describe as a Grand Challenge, which is a challenge fund focused on soliciting proposals around a very specific critical barrier that, if removed, would help solve an important health problem in the developing world, with a high likelihood of global impact through widespread implementation.

Typical features of a challenge fund include open competition, innovative or evidence-based proposals. Proposals are evaluated based on a fixed scoring criteria, and a governance structure that incorporates a voting committee to approve funding decisions. Other common features include a focus on innovation, leveraging other resources, and local solutions. Research performed by TripleLine Consulting identified seven characteristics of challenges funds: "(1) provides grants or subsidies (2) with an explicit public purpose (3) between independent agencies (4) with grant recipients selected competitively (5) on the basis of advertised rules and processes (6) who retain significant discretion over formulation and execution of their proposals and (7) share risks with the grant provider."

Challenge funds greatly differ in size, from over $200 million to under $5 million.

== History ==
Academia, medical research, and the social sectors have used challenge funds for several decades; however, what is now mostly referred to as challenge funds are a byproduct of DFID's efforts beginning in the 1990s. Early challenge funds in the social sector supported the use of public–private partnerships, for example in the UK for urban issues, including the City Challenge, Rural Challenge and Single Regeneration Budget Challenge Funds.

By 1997, over 50 challenge funds were operating in the UK, disbursing £3,390 million. Of these, the largest was the Single Regeneration Budget (SRB). The first challenge fund within the British overseas development assistance programme (now DFID or UKAid) was the 1997 Business Sector Challenge Fund, followed in 2000 by the Financial Deepening Challenge Fund and the Business Linkages Challenge Fund that were tested in East Africa and later expanded to other regions.

== Eligibility ==
Eligibility criteria vary from fund to fund.

== Effectiveness ==
The effectiveness of challenge funds has been evaluated, in part, by donors, consultants, and implementers with varying opinions as to their value for money and effectiveness. Additionally, certain donors such as SIDA have established guidelines to ensure challenge funds are as effective as possible at delivering the intended social impact.

IAP Criteria
1.	Clear commercial driver and potential for commercial viability
2.	Potential to reach scale
3.	Managed by a company or a market oriented organisation
4.	Poor people benefit (income, products, environment, opportunities, gender equality)
5.	Avoid negative effects (environmental, market distortion)
6.	Clearly defined elements of cost-sharing (With the company itself providing at a minimum 50% - which should not come from other public financing)
7.	Innovative; going beyond what exists now, in terms of the product /service, the delivery mechanism/business model and/or market reach
8.	Project would not take place at the same scale or have the same development impact without IAP funding

== Examples ==
Below are a few examples of challenges funds, which are funded by one or more donor agencies.

=== Africa Enterprise Challenge Fund ===
The Africa Enterprise Challenge Fund (AECF) is a multiple window funding platform funded by DFID and managed by KPMG with challenge funds in agriculture and energy in Africa (including Kenya, Tanzania, and South Sudan). AECF focuses on supporting businesses and raising the income of the rural poor.

=== Emprender Paz ===
Emprender Paz is a SIDA supported challenge fund in Columbia focused on private sector solutions for peace-building.

=== Enterprise Challenge Fund ===
The Enterprise Challenge Fund (ECF) (2007-2013) was an Australian government challenge fund that ran from 2007 to 2013. ECF was the backbone for the development of the DECD standards for evaluating challenge funds. Numerous reports and evaluations have been developed by or based on ECF.

=== Financial Education Fund ===
Managed by Cardno, the Financial Education Fund (FEF) was a DFID challenge fund established in 2008 focusing on financial literacy and access to financial services in Africa.

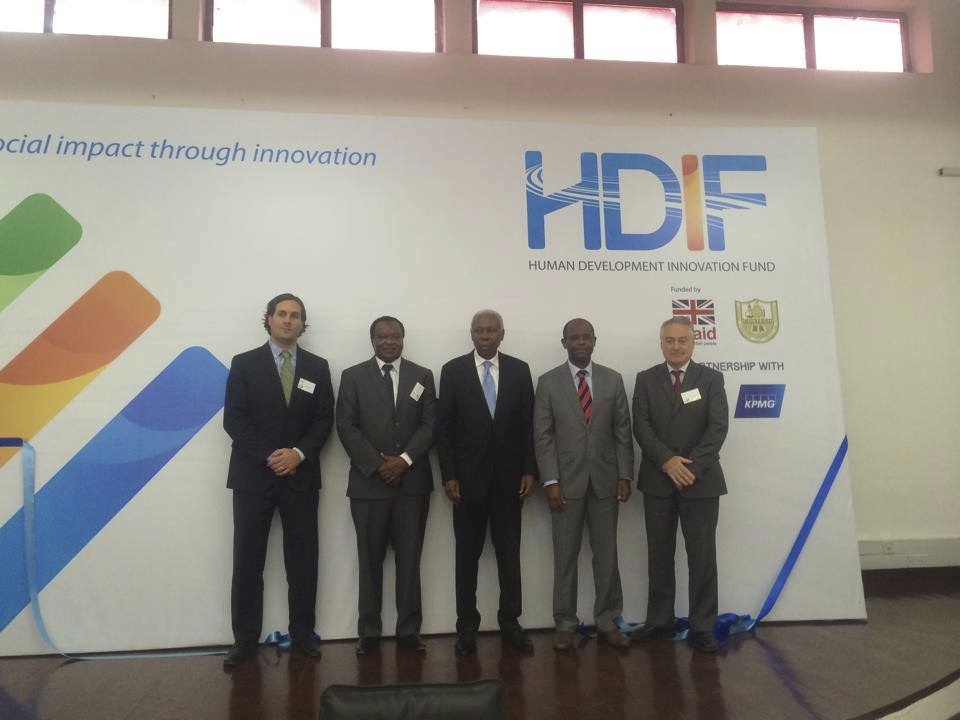
Launch event for HDIF, Dar es Salaam, Tanzania. Pictured (l to r): David B. McGinty, HDIF Team Leader; Dr. Hassan Mshinda, Director, COSTECH; Dr. Mohamed Gharib Bilal, Vice President, Tanzania; Dr. Prof. Makame Mbarawa, Minister, Ministry of Communication, Science and Technology; Marshall Elliott, Head, DFID Tanzania

=== Girls Education Challenge Fund ===
Established in 2012 and currently scheduled through 2016, the Girls Education Challenge Fund (GEC) is a GBP 300 million fund managed by PwC, focusing the quality and access to education for girls in 22 countries in Asia and Africa.

=== Human Development Innovation Fund ===
Palladium International manages the Human Development Innovation Fund (HDIF), which is a GBP 30 million DFID challenge fund seeking to identify innovations in education, health and water, sanitation and hygiene (WASH) across Tanzania. HDIF also engages in activities to "foster a thriving innovation eco-system in Tanzania" and support a government partner in building this eco-system, Commission for Science and Technology (COSTECH).

=== LIFT ===
Managed by TradeMark East Africa (TMEA), The Logistics Innovation for Trade (LIFT) challenge fund is a $16 million DFID fund for reducing the cost of transport and logistics in East Africa.

=== Scottish Climate Challenge Fund ===
A Scottish government fund for projects on climate change issues. It illustrates the need for information about challenge funds to be disseminated to potential recipients. A review showed that few applications were made by minority ethnic groups, who were very aware of climate change but not the fund. Zarina Ahmad, the Climate Change and Environment Officer at the Council for Ethnic Minority Voluntary Organisations, Scotland, introduced advice, mentorship and a resulting in applications rising from 3 in four years to 100 in seven years.

=== Seed Alliance ===
Seed Alliance is a challenge fund focusing on internet and digital innovation.

=== Vietnam Business Challenge Fund ===
The Vietnam Business Challenge Fund (VBCF) focusing on developing "inclusive businesses" working in agriculture, low carbon growth, infrastructure, and basic services.

Sakchyam Access to Finance Challenge Fund, also known as AFP Challenge Fund, is focusing on increasing access to finance in Nepal. Ref: www.sakchyam.com.np

=== Challenge Fund - Call for Innovation ===
The Challenge Fund 1 & 2 (CF) is an initiative of the Sèmè City Development Agency (ADSC), in partnership with the World Bank and the National Agency for the Promotion of Heritage and the Development of Tourism of Benin (ANPT).

== Innovation Challenges - UNDP ==
Innovation challenges are defined by UNDP as prized challenges that Business Units (Country Offices) organize to solicit innovative ideas and solutions to address development challenges which cannot be achieved through traditional solicitation processes. In some cases, Calls for proposals under Innovation Challenges are funded by donors like: Czech Challenge Fund (Ministry of Foreign Affairs of Czech Republic), Slovak Challenge Fund (Ministry of Foreign and European Affairs) or Polish Challenge Fund (Ministry of Foreign Affairs).

== Grand Challenges ==
Challenges funds and "grand challenges" have overlapping features but are distinct for numerous reasons. Grand challenges are often referred to as a "family of initiatives" focused on very specific problems that try to find the best solutions to those discreet questions.

=== Gates Foundation ===
The Gates Foundation runs two grand challenges: "Grand Challenges in Global Health" that was established in 2013 and the newer "Grand Challenges Explorations" that funds early-stage innovations.

=== Canada ===
The Canadian government runs or participates in numbers grand challenges in areas from hypertension to saving children's lives to mental health.

=== USAID ===
As of 2014, USAID runs or participates in six grand challenges: Fighting Ebola, Securing Water for Food, Saving Lives at Birth (with the Canadian government, DFID, the Gates Foundation, and the World Bank), Powering Agriculture, and All Children Reading (with World Vision and the Australian government), and Making All Voices Count (with Sida, DFID, and the Omidyar Network.

=== Others ===
Outside of international development, governments have continued to utilize challenge funds.

==== Climate Challenge Fund ====
The "Climate Challenge Fund" is domestic challenge fund in Scotland focused on climate change issues.

==== DARPA Grand Challenge ====
The DARPA Grand Challenge is a prize competition for autonomous vehicles funded by the Defense Advanced Research Projects Agency.

== See also ==
- Economic Development
