= Tanzanite =

Blue to purple variety of the mineral zoisite

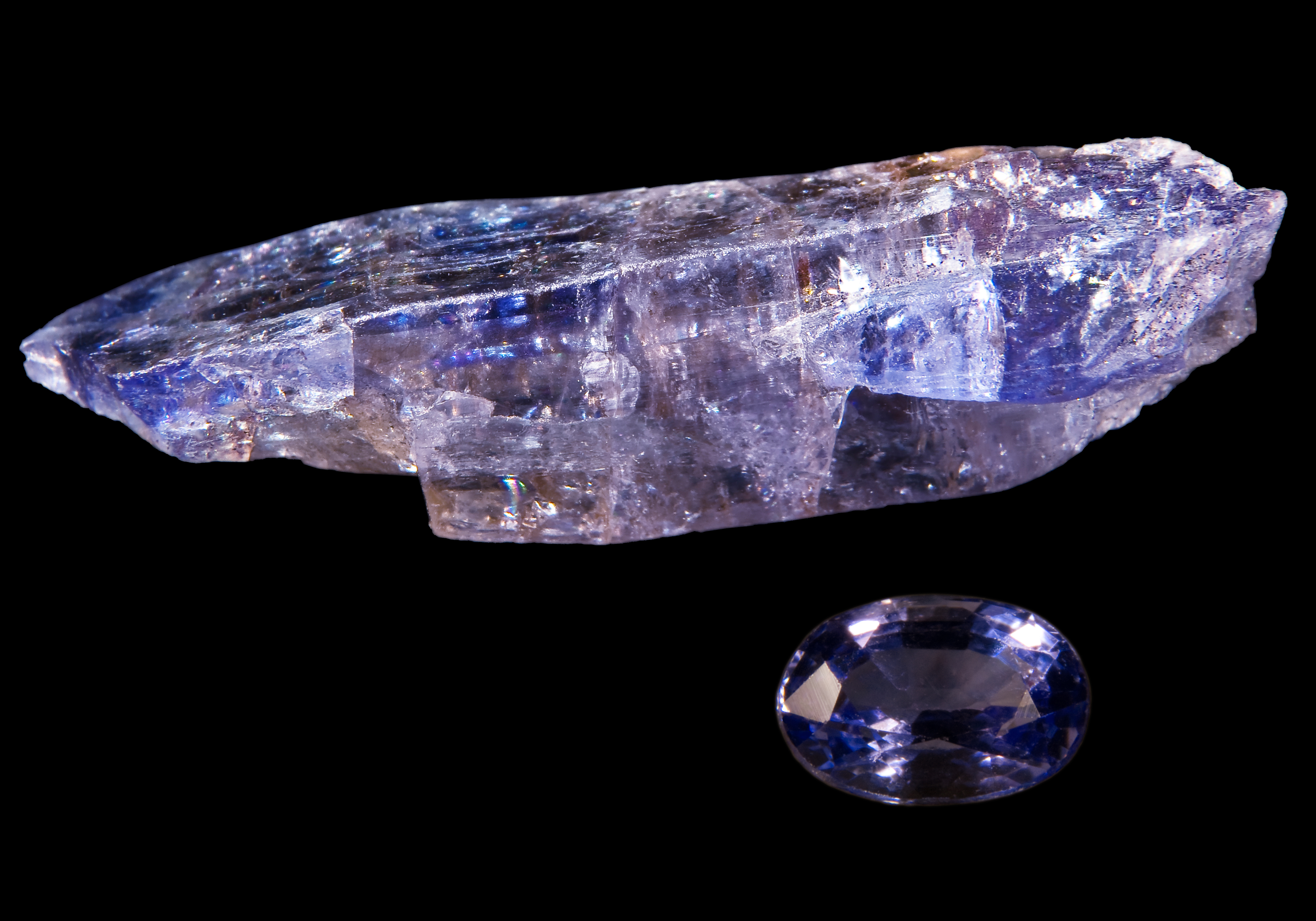

General
- Category: Sorosilicate: zoisite variety
- Formula: [Ca_{2}Al_{3}(SiO_{4})(Si_{2}O_{7})O(OH)] + (Cr,Sr)
- Strunz classification: 09.BG.10
- Crystal system: Orthorhombic
- Space group: Pnma (no. 62)

Identification
- Color: Royal blue, indigo, violet/purple
- Crystal habit: Prismatic crystals with striations; massive to columnar
- Twinning: Penetration twins
- Cleavage: Perfect {010}, imperfect {100}
- Fracture: Uneven to conchoidal
- Mohs scale hardness: 6.5
- Luster: Vitreous, pearly on cleavage surfaces
- Streak: White or colorless
- Specific gravity: 3.10–3.38
- Optical properties: Biaxial positive
- Refractive index: 1.69–1.70
- Birefringence: 0.006–0.018
- Pleochroism: Present, dichroism or trichroism, depending on heat treatment

Tanzanite is the blue and violet variety of the mineral zoisite (a calcium aluminium hydroxyl sorosilicate). The color is caused by small amounts of vanadium. Tanzanite belongs to the epidote mineral group. Tanzanite is only found in Simanjiro District of Manyara Region in Tanzania, in a very small mining area approximately 7 km (4.3 mi) long and 2 km (1.2 mi) wide near the Mererani Hills.

Tanzanite is noted for its remarkably strong trichroism, appearing alternately blue, violet and burgundy depending on crystal orientation. Tanzanite can also appear differently when viewed under different lighting conditions. The blues appear more evident when subjected to fluorescent light and the violet hues can be seen readily when viewed under incandescent illumination. In its rough state tanzanite is coloured a reddish brown to clear, and it requires heat treatment to remove the brownish "veil" and bring out the blue violet of the stone.

The gemstone was given the name "tanzanite" by Tiffany & Co. after Tanzania, the country in which it was discovered. The scientific name of "blue-violet zoisite" was not thought to be sufficiently consumer friendly by Tiffany's marketing department, who introduced it to the market in 1968. In 2002, the American Gem Trade Association chose tanzanite as a December birthstone, the first change to their birthstone list since 1912.

== Geology ==
Tanzanite was formed around 585 million years ago during the mid-Ediacaran period by massive plate tectonic activity and intense heat in the area that would later become Mount Kilimanjaro. The mineral is located in a relatively complex geological environment. Deposits are typically found in the "hinge" of isoclinal folds.

== History ==
=== Discovery ===
There are many accounts of the discovery of tanzanite, but only one recognised by the government of Tanzania. In January 1967, Jumanne Mhero Ngoma (originally from Same District, Kilimanjaro) stumbled upon the sparkling blue stones at the Mererani hills in the Kiteto District of the former Arusha Region (now Manyara Region). He was issued with a certificate of recognition three years later by then-President Julius Nyerere and a financial reward of Tsh 50,000 for his efforts. In 1984, he was issued with a certificate for scientific discovery by the Tanzania Commission for Science and Technology.

=== Commercial history ===
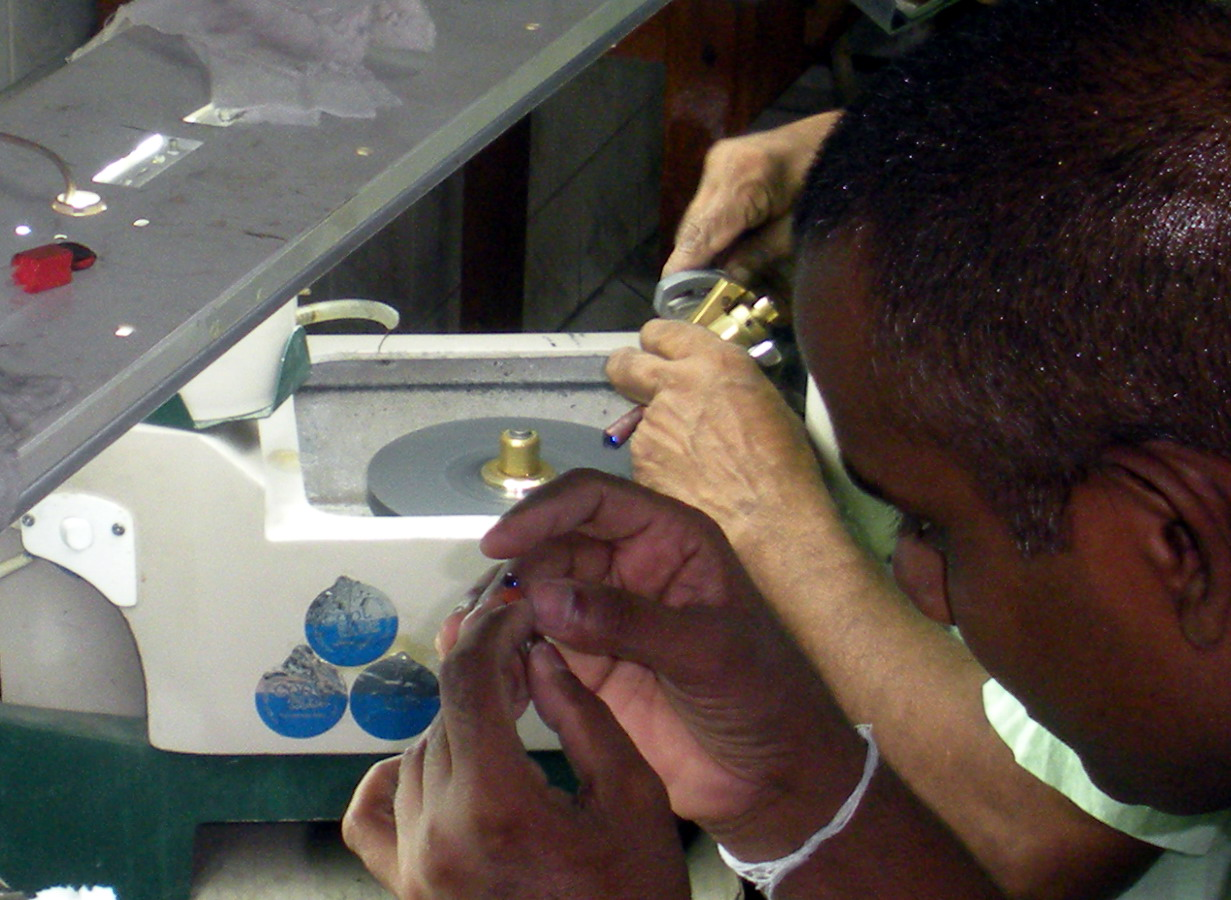
Craft work on tanzanite

In July 1967, Manuel de Souza, a Goan tailor and part-time gold prospector living in Arusha, found transparent fragments of blue and blue-purple gem crystals on a ridge near Mererani, some 40 km (25 mi) southeast of Arusha. He assumed that the mineral was olivine (peridot) but, after soon realizing it was not, he concluded it was "dumortierite" (a blue non-gem mineral). Shortly thereafter, the stones were shown to John Saul, a Nairobi-based consulting geologist and gemstone wholesaler who was then mining aquamarine in the region around Mount Kenya. Saul, who later discovered the famous ruby deposits in the Tsavo area of Kenya, eliminated dumortierite and cordierite as possibilities, and sent samples to his father, Hyman Saul, vice president at Saks Fifth Avenue in New York City. Hyman Saul took the samples to the Gemological Institute of America which correctly identified the new gem as a variety of the mineral zoisite. Correct identification was also made by mineralogists at Harvard University, the British Museum and Heidelberg University, but the first person to get the identification right was Ian McCloud, a Tanzanian government geologist based in Dodoma.

Scientifically called "blue zoisite", the gemstone was renamed as tanzanite by Henry B. Platt, a great-grandson of Louis Comfort Tiffany and a vice president of Tiffany & Co., who wanted to capitalize on the rarity and single location of the gem and thought that "blue zoisite" (zoi′sīt) would not sell well. Tiffany's original campaign advertised that tanzanite could now be found in two places: "in Tanzania and at Tiffany's".

From 1967, an estimated two million carats of tanzanite were mined in Tanzania before the mines were nationalized by the Tanzanian government in 1971.

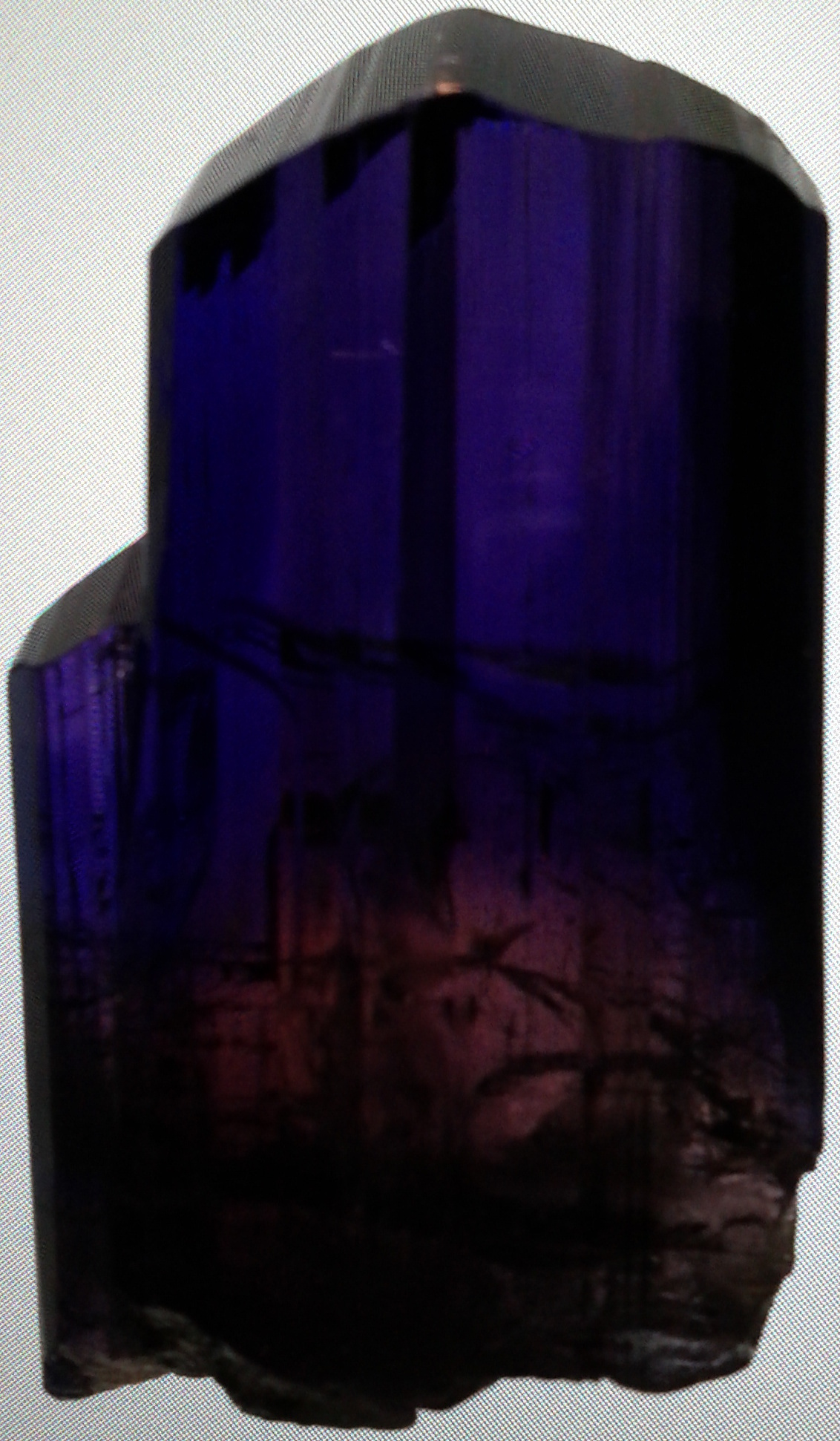
Multicolored tanzanite crystal

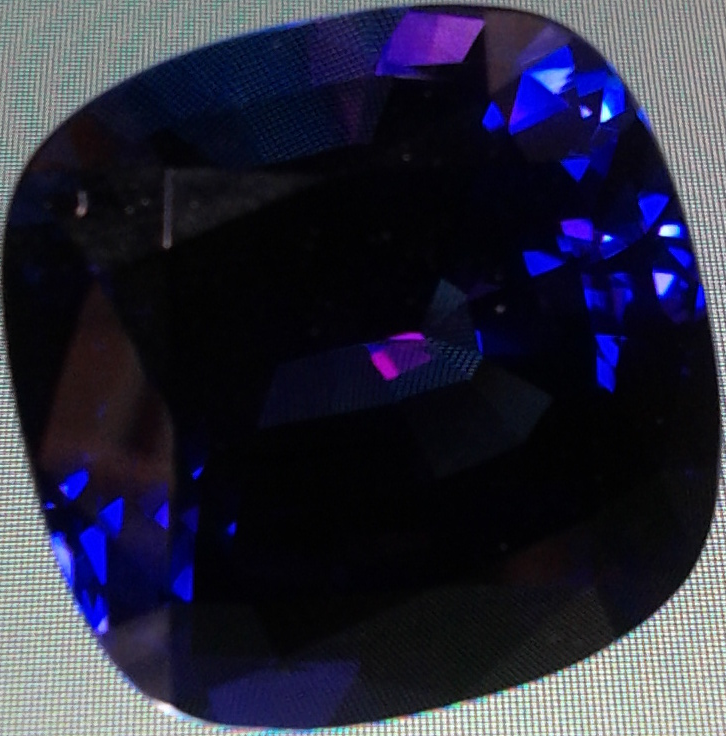
Untreated tanzanite gemstone

==== Mining developments ====
In 1990, the Tanzanian government split the tanzanite mines into four sections: Blocks A, B, C and D. Blocks A and C were awarded to large operators, while Blocks B and D were reserved for local miners. In 2005, the government renewed the lease of Block C mine to TanzaniteOne, who paid US$40 million for their lease and mining license.

In June 2003, the Tanzanian government introduced legislation banning the export of unprocessed tanzanite to India, and like many gemstones, most tanzanite is cut in Jaipur. The reason for the ban is to attempt to spur development of local processing facilities, thereby boosting the economy and recouping profits. This ban was phased in over a two-year period, until which time only stones over 0.5 grams were affected. In 2010, the government of Tanzania banned the export of rough stones weighing more than one gram.

TanzaniteOne Mining Ltd is owned by Richland Resources, but a 2010 law in Tanzania required them to cede 50% ownership of their mining license to the Tanzanian State Mining Company (Stamico). Production in 2011 amounted to 2,400,000 carats (480 kg; 1,100 lb), earning them $24 million.

Following the construction of a 24 km (15 mi) perimeter wall around the mines, to improve security and prevent smuggling, production rose from 147.7 kg (325.6 lb) in 2018 to a record 781.2 kg (1,722 lb) in 2019.

On 24 June 2020, artisanal miner Saniniu Laizer unearthed two rough tanzanite stones, weighing 11.14 kg (55,700 carats) in total, which he sold to the Tanzanian government's Ministry of Minerals for TSh 7.74 billion (US $3.35 million), breaking the previous record set in 2005 by a 16,839‑carat stone

Total reserves of tanzanite are estimated at 109,000,000 carats (21,800 kg; 48,100 lb), according to a report published in 2018. Block C, by far the largest site, has been estimated at 87,100,000 carats (17,400 kg; 38,400 lb) with a Life of Mine (LOM) expected to last until the 2040s.

== Factors affecting value: grading ==
There is no universally accepted method of grading coloured gemstones. TanzaniteOne, a major commercial player in the tanzanite market, through its non-profit subsidiary, the Tanzanite Foundation, has introduced its own color-grading system. The new system's colour-grading scales divide tanzanite colors into a range of hues, between bluish-violet, indigo and violetish-blue. As of mid-March 2026, it is valued $100-$800 per carat depending on the grade.

The normal primary and secondary hues in tanzanite are blue and violet. Untreated tanzanite is a trichroic gemstone, meaning that light that enters this anisotropic crystal gets refracted on different paths, with different colour absorption on each of the three optical axes. As a result of this phenomenon, a multitude of colors have been observed in various specimens: shades of purple, violet, indigo, blue, cyan, green, yellow, orange, red and brown. After heating, tanzanite becomes dichroic. The dichroic colours range from violet through bluish-violet to indigo and violetish-blue to blue.

Clarity grading in coloured gemstones is based on the eye-clean standard, that is, a gem is considered flawless if no inclusions are visible with the unaided eye (assuming 20/20 vision). The Gemological Institute of America classifies tanzanite as a Type I gemstone, meaning it is normally eye-clean. Gems with eye-visible inclusions will be traded at deep discounts.

=== Heat treatment ===
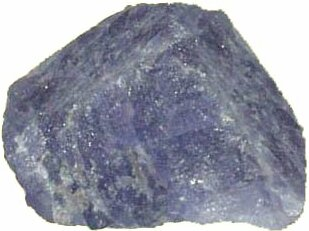
A rough sample of tanzanite.

Tanzanite forms as a brownish crystal that concurrently shows three colours – brown, blue, and violet – hence it is a "trichroic" mineral. Heating, either by natural metamorphic processes underground, or artificial industrial processes in a furnace, removes the brown or burgundy colour component to produce a stronger violet-blue color and makes the stone only reflects blue and violet, hence "dichroic". Rarely, gem-quality tanzanite will heat to a green primary hue, almost always accompanied by a blue or violet secondary hue. These green tanzanite have some meaningful value in the collector market, but are seldom of interest to commercial buyers.

Heat-treating in a furnace is usually carried out at between 370–390 °C (698–734 °F) for 30 minutes. The stones should not have any cracks or bubbles, as they could shatter or the cracks/ bubble could increase in size during furnace heating.

Some stones found close to the surface in the early days of the discovery (in an area now called "D block") were gem-quality blue without the need for heat treatment, probably the result of a wildfire in the area which heated the stones underground. This gave rise to the idea that "D block" stones were more desirable than tanzanite found in other parts of the small tanzanite mining area.

Since heat treatment is universal, it has no effect on price, and finished gems are assumed to be heat-treated. Gemological Institute of America states that the source of heating is gemologically undetectable, but is assumed because of its prevalence.

Tanzanite may be subjected to other forms of treatment as well. Recently, coated tanzanites were discovered and tested by the AGTA and AGL laboratories. A thin layer containing cobalt, determined by X-ray fluorescence, had been applied to improve the colour. It was noted that "coatings in particular are not considered permanent", and in the United States are required to be disclosed at the point of sale.

=== Pleochroism ===
Tanzanite has the physical property that it appears to have multiple colours based on the angle of the light hitting the stone, called pleochroism. Most tanzanites are blue when viewed from one direction but can vary from violet to red when seen from a different angle.

The physical characters can make the cutting process difficult due to the problem of selecting the "perfect" color. The finished colour of the gemstone will vary depending on how the table cut reflects the light.

== Imitation and cobalt-coated tanzanite ==
As of 2020, tanzanite has never been successfully synthesized in a laboratory, so all genuine tanzanite is naturally occurring. However, because of its rarity and market demand, tanzanite has been imitated in several ways. Among the materials used for this are cubic zirconia, synthetic spinel, yttrium aluminium garnet, and colored glass. A test of the stone with a dichroscope can easily distinguish these from genuine tanzanite, as only tanzanite will appear doubly refractive: The two viewing windows of the dichroscope will display different colors (one window blue, the other violet) when viewing genuine tanzanite, while the imitation stones are all singly refractive and will cause both windows to appear the same color (violet).

Synthetic forsterite (Mg_{2}SiO_{4}, the magnesium-rich end-member of olivine) has also been sold as tanzanite, and presents a similar appearance. It can be distinguished from tanzanite in three ways:

1. The first is by using a refractometer: Forsterite will show a refractive index of between 1.63–1.67, while tanzanite will show a higher index of 1.685–1.707 .
2. The second way is by using a special light filter: Genuine tanzanite will appear orange-pink, while forsterite will appear green when viewed through a Hanneman filter.
3. The third way is by examining a cut stone through its crown facets and viewing the pavilion cuts at the back of the stone using a standard jeweller's loupe: Forsterite will show birefringence, making the pavilion cuts appear "doubled up", while the much lower birefringence of tanzanite will not have this characteristic.

Lower grades of tanzanite are occasionally enhanced by a vacuum deposition coating of cobalt; the cobalt layer imparts a deeper shade of blue. Similar to other gems' thin-film coatings, the cobalt film does not adhere well to these stones: It tends to rub off over time, resulting in a much less intensely colored stone, although still tanzanite. The practice of cobalt coating is considered deceptive unless well-advertised.

== See also ==
- Gemology
