= Ministry of Education, Science, Technology and Vocational Training =

Government ministry of Tanzania

Ministry overview
- Formed: 2015
- Preceding agencies: Ministry of Education and Vocational Training; Ministry of Communication, Science and Technology (partial)
- Jurisdiction: Government of Tanzania
- Headquarters: 7 Magogoni Street, Kivukoni, Dar es Salaam, Tanzania
- Minister responsible: Adolf Mkenda
- Deputy Minister responsible: Omar Kipanga
- Website: The Ministry Website

The Ministry of Education, Science, Technology and Vocational Training is a ministry of the Tanzanian government. It is responsible for the provision of education, vocational training and policy on science and technology.

== History ==
The Ministry was formed by President John Magufuli and was created as an amalgamation of responsibilities from the Ministry of Education and Vocational Training and the Ministry of Communication, Science and Technology. The communications role was merged into the Ministry of Works, Transport and Communications.

== See also ==
- Education in Tanzania
- Government of Tanzania
- University of Dar es Salaam
