= Agri-Impact Limited =

Ghana-based agribusiness organisation

Agri-Impact Limited is a Ghana-based agribusiness development and programme-management organisation that operates across more than 30 African countries. The company is recognised for its role in agricultural value-chain development, youth employment and empowerment, and technology-driven agribusiness innovation. Headquartered in Accra, Ghana. Agri-Impact collaborates with development partners, academic institutions, and government agencies to promote commercial agriculture and enhance food security in Ghana and the wider sub-region. Agri Impact Limited is founded by renowned Ghanaian agribusiness expert, Daniel Fahene Acquaye.

== Subsidiaries and Structure ==
Agri-Impact Limited operates as part of the Agri-Impact Group, a Ghanaian agribusiness holding structure established to manage the company's expanding portfolio of agricultural enterprises across Africa. The group's subsidiaries focus on complementary areas of agribusiness development, project implementation, logistics, training, and research.

== Agri-Impact Limited (AIL) ==
Agri-Impact Limited serves as the flagship company of the group. It provides agribusiness consultancy, project design, and value-chain development services in more than 30 African countries. AIL leads the implementation of the Harnessing Agricultural Productivity and Prosperity for Youth (HAPPY) programme under the Mastercard Foundation, which aims to create more than 326,000jobs for Ghanaian youth including Persons with Disabilities.

== Fresh Logistics Limited (FLL) ==
Fresh Logistics Limited operates as the logistics, greenhouse management, and fresh produce marketing arm of Agri-Impact Group.The company provides production, aggregation, and supply chain solutions that bridge smallholder farmers,greenhouse enterprises, and export markets. With operations centered in Dawhenya, Kwame Nkrumah University of Science and Technology (KNUST), University of Cape Coast (UCC), Bodukwan, Apegusu and Brekusu, the company plays a pivotal role in promoting sustainable agriculture, food security, and youth employment through innovative projects such as the Youth in Greenhouse Enterprise Project (YUGEP), a partnership between Agri-Impact and EXIM Bank Ghana. Fresh Logistics provides comprehensive production, aggregation, and supply chain solutions that connect smallholder farmers, greenhouse enterprises, and export markets.The company plays a critical role in strengthening Ghana's agricultural value chain.

Freh Logistics Limited has a strong buyer network, including Eden Tree, Farmers Markets, Vegetable Direct, JOFOEL, Whitebage, Agripak and numerous corner shops, retailers, and distributors across major market centres in Ghana. Fresh Logistics Limited oversees post-harvest handling, aggregation, and distribution of vegetables produced through Agri-Impact's greenhouse clusters. According to The Business & Financial Times, FLL operates one of West Africa's largest commercial greenhouse facilities and supplies vegetables to Ghanaian retailers such as Shoprite and Eden Tree.

== ASNAPP (Agribusiness in Sustainable Natural African Plant Products) ==
ASNAPP is the group's non-profit affiliate. It was established in 1997 under USAID funding to promote the sustainable commercialisation of natural African plant products such as rooibos, honeybush, and essential oils. ASNAPP operates in several African countries, offering technical support and market access for smallholder producers.

== ECOSIB (Entrepreneurship for Commercial Seed Incubation Business) ==
The ECOSIB initiative focuses on seed-sector development and entrepreneurship training for young agripreneurs. It supports local seed production, market linkages, and business incubation for start-ups in Ghana's seed value chain.

== Activities and Partnerships ==
Agri-Impact acts as a key implementing partner of the Mastercard Foundation’s Harnessing Agricultural Productivity & Prosperity for Youth (HAPPY) programme, a four-year, US $61 million initiative designed to convert demand in the rice, soybean, tomato and poultry value chains into employment and market opportunities for youth, with a pronounced emphasis on young women and persons with disabilities.

== Mastercard Foundation ==
HAPPY programme seeks to create approximately 326,000 “dignified and fulfilling” jobs for Ghanaian youth, boost food production by nearly 190,000 tons and reduce the country's import bill by an estimated US$200 million. In its advocacy role, Agri-Impact's leadership has highlighted Ghana's annual post-harvest losses estimated at US$1.9-2 billion, which, in the words of the company's CEO, are enough to feed the country's Ashanti Region for more than a year.

Also, in October 2024, media outlets reported that the HAPPY programme (led by Agri-Impact) aimed to help Ghana reduce its food import bill by around 10% annually by producing an estimated 189,000 metric tonnes of food and generating close to US$200 million in annual income for youth participants.

== Greenhouse and Youth Initiatives ==
Agri-Impact Limited is widely recognized for its work in greenhouse agriculture and youth entrepreneurship across Ghana. Through the Youth in Greenhouse Enterprise Project (YUGEP), funded by the EXIM Bank Ghana, the company has spearheaded efforts to train young graduates in modern greenhouse vegetable production and agribusiness management. The project aims to address Ghana's seasonal vegetable shortages, promote import substitution, and create sustainable employment for youth.

According to project summaries published on LandFinanceHub and corroborated by EXIM Bank Ghana, YUGEP involves the installation of over 200 greenhouse units across six regions of Ghana, producing crops such as tomato, cucumber, sweet pepper, and lettuce. Each greenhouse cluster serves as a business incubation hub where trained youth receive practical exposure in production, marketing, and agritech solutions. Reports indicate that the initiative has generated over GH¢300 million in revenue and trained more than 200 youth agripreneurs since its inception.

== Agri-Impact and KNUST ==
In September 2025, Agri-Impact secured accreditation from Kwame Nkrumah University of Science and Technology (KNUST) to deliver short-courses in agribusiness and agritech through its Centre for Capacity Building and Innovation. The initiative includes new modules such as drone-pilot training to support service-based agriculture interventions and reinforce youth employability in the sector. In April 2025, Agri-Impact deepened its partnership with KNUST by jointly inspecting greenhouse and poultry project sites on the university campus. The visit underscored the firm's contribution to applied research, agritech deployment and the scaling of greenhouse-based vegetable and poultry production in the Ghanaian context.

=== Dan F. Acquaye Drone Innovation and Simulation Unit ===
The initiative includes new modules such as drone-pilot training, greenhouse management, and agritech entrepreneurship, designed to equip young people with service-based agricultural skills and enhance employability in the sector. According to The Ghanaian Farmer, the partnership also supports applied research and technology transfer through student internships and demonstration projects hosted by Agri-Impact's training facilities.

In July 2025, KNUST inaugurated the Dan F. Acquaye Drone Innovation and Simulation Unit in recognition of Agri-Impact's contribution to agritech education. The facility features a drone training infrastructure, simulation lab, and showroom for unmanned aerial vehicles used in crop mapping, nutrient analysis, and digital agriculture research. It forms part of KNUST's collaboration with Agri-Impact under the Harnessing Agricultural Productivity and Prosperity for Youth (HAPPY) programme, aimed at integrating advanced technology into Ghana's agricultural training systems. The collaboration reflects Agri-Impact's broader strategy of integrating education, technology, and private-sector partnerships to promote youth employability in agribusiness. It complements ongoing initiatives under the HAPPY programme, where KNUST serves as an academic partner for curriculum development and innovation exchange.

== Agri-Impact and National Service Scheme ==
In December 2023, NSS signed a Memorandum of Understanding (MoU) with Agri‑Impact Limited (a subsidiary/affiliate of Agri-Impact Group) to implement the Harnessing Agricultural Productivity & Prosperity for Youth (HAPPY) programme for approximately 90,000 tertiary graduates over four years. The initiative targets job creation in agriculture (rice, soya, tomato, poultry) and aims to increase food production and reduce imports

On 13 October 2025, a media report detailed that the NSS and Agri-Impact planned to deploy service personnel into agribusiness activities (including greenhouse and poultry production) as part of national service reform, placing youth not in clerical roles but into hands-on agribusiness training. The collaboration emphasizes transforming national service from traditional postings into a mechanism for youth employment, agribusiness entrepreneurship, and import substitution. In the Graphic Online report, the National Service Scheme indicated that the partnership “would absorb about 50,000 service personnel annually into agribusiness activities, ranging from crop production and poultry farming to agro-processing and distribution.”

== Young Agribusiness Professionals (YAPP) Cohort ==
Also, In October 2025, at the Young Agribusiness Professionals (YAPP) Cohort 3 Grand Finale and Awards Night in Accra, chief executive officer Daniel Fahene Acquaye publicly acknowledged three national service personnel deployed under the NSS-Agri-Impact partnership for having achieved production and revenue milestones: the trio generated GH₵350,000 from a one-acre greenhouse farm within eight months This event formed part of the broader NSS–Agri-Impact agreement under the “Harnessing Agricultural Productivity and Prosperity for Youth (HAPPY)” programme, which aims to integrate national service personnel into commercial agribusiness ventures and transform the national service system into a youth-employment pathway.By showcasing the tangible earnings of service-deployed graduates, the partnership sought to reposition national service roles from traditional clerical postings toward skills-based agribusiness entrepreneurship.

Mr. Daniel Acquaye used the occasion to stress the importance of treating national service personnel as “assets, not errand boys,” underscoring the collaboration's emphasis on practical training, market linkages, and youth empowerment. He added that such success stories serve as proof points for the social and commercial viability of greenhouse horticulture and youth-led agribusiness in Ghana's value-chain development strategy.

== Impact & Sector Role ==
Agri-Impact Limited plays a dual role in Ghana's agricultural landscape as both an agribusiness implementer and a policy stakeholder. The company's executives have been cited in national and regional media for highlighting systemic challenges in the sector, including inadequate storage infrastructure, limited processing capacity, post-harvest losses, and logistics constraints that contribute to food insecurity.

Agri-Impact's Chief Executive Officer, Daniel Fahene Acquaye, has advocated for increased investment in agribusiness and the establishment of a national agricultural investment fund to finance mechanisation, processing, and innovation. He has argued that sustained financing and improved logistics are essential for Ghana's transition from subsistence to commercial agriculture.

At a regional agribusiness dialogue in October 2025, the company's Deputy Chief Executive Officer, Juliana Asante-Dartey, encouraged a shift from raw-commodity exports to value-added agribusiness. She cited the example of bifonia, noting that while a kilogram of the unprocessed plant sells for about US$2, the processed form can fetch US$100. She called for the creation of a dedicated “Agri-Fund” to promote value addition and agro-industrialisation.
