= Ministry of Communication, Science and Technology =

Government ministry of Tanzania

- Wizara ya Mawasiliano, Sayansi na Teknolojia (Swahili)

Ministry overview
- Formed: February 2008
- Preceding Ministry: Ministry of Higher Education, Science and Technology
- Dissolved: 2015
- Superseding agencies: Ministry of Education, Science, Technology and Vocational Training; Ministry of Works, Transport and Communications
- Jurisdiction: Government of Tanzania
- Headquarters: Dar es Salaam
- Minister responsible: Makame Mbarawa
- Deputy Minister responsible: January Makamba
- Ministry executive: Florens Turuka, Permanent Secretary
- Website: mst.go.tz

The Ministry of Communication, and ICT was a Tanzanian government ministry that was established in February 2008. The ministry's roles were policy formulation, monitoring and evaluation, and regulatory and legal matters pertaining to communication, information and communications technology (ICT), science, technology, and innovation.

== History ==
The ministry's predecessor was the Ministry of Higher Education, Science and Technology (MHEST), which was known as the Ministry of Science, Technology and Higher Education before 2005.

The ministry was later split and merged under President John Magufuli's cabinet. The science and technology remit was combined with the Ministry of Education and Vocational Training to form the Ministry of Education, Science, Technology and Vocational Training. The communications role became part of the Ministry of Works, Transport and Communications.

== Ministry institutions ==
Subsidiary institutions under this ministry include:

- Tanzania Atomic Energy Commission
- Tanzania Commission for Science and Technology (COSTECH)
- Tanzania Communication Regulatory Authority
- Dar es Salaam Institute of Technology
- Mbeya University of Science and Technology
- Arusha Technical College
