= Disability in Tanzania =

Disability in Tanzania refers to the social, economic, and legal situation of people with disabilities in Tanzania. The country has made progress in recognizing the rights of people with disabilities through legislation and its ratification of the Convention on the Rights of Persons with Disabilities in 2009. However, residents in Tanzania continue to experience challenges in areas such as participation in public life, access to education, employment, transportation, and social protection. World Bank and United Nations reports have highlighted gaps between Tanzania's legal and policy framework and its implementation in practice, as well as continuing discrimination, exclusion and social stigma. These challenges particularly affect children and women with disabilities and people with albinism and visual impairments.

== Living conditions ==
=== Delayed diagnosis and identification ===
Limited access to healthcare and specialist services can result in delayed identification and diagnosis of disabilities. A 2026 qualitative study on children with disabilities in Mainland Tanzania found that weak coordination between healthcare services and other institutions, limited access to medical specialists, financial barriers, and inadequate referral systems hindered early detection and intervention. Community health workers also often lacked sufficient training and resources to identify disabilities at an early stage.

=== Accusations of witchcraft, demonization and superstition ===
As in other parts of Africa, beliefs associating disability with witchcraft, curses, and other supernatural causes have been documented in Tanzania. A qualitative study of families of people with intellectual disabilities in Dar es Salaam found that some participants regarded disability as a "bad omen" for the family and associated it with spiritual or supernatural causes. Some families sought traditional healers in an attempt to find a cure, while others reported that parents of children with disabilities could be accused of witchcraft or of deliberately causing their child's disability to obtain wealth. Participants also reported fears that people with intellectual disabilities could be targeted by individuals practicing witchcraft, contributing to social isolation and restrictions on their movement. The study documented cases in which stigma and discrimination against people with mental illness were associated with family abandonment and other forms of social exclusion.

=== Albinism ===
A more severe situation has been documented among people with albinism, who have been subjected to violent attacks, some of which have resulted in deaths, because of beliefs associating them with supernatural powers. Myths that the body parts of people with albinism possess magical properties or can bring wealth and good fortune have contributed to ritual attacks and mutilation, including attacks against children.

=== Accessibility and mobility ===
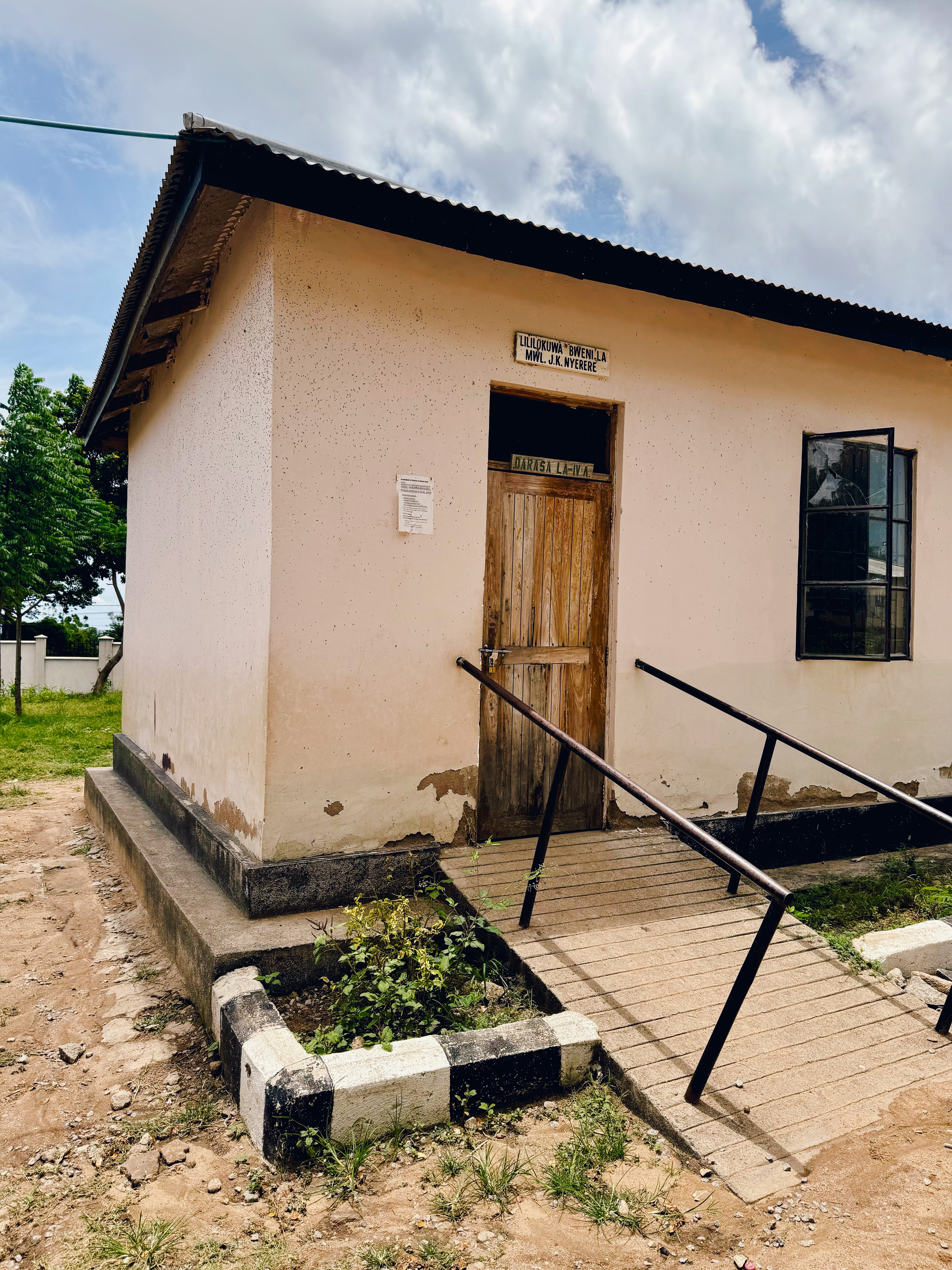
A school in Musoma (Mara Region) with a wheelchair ramp at its entrance

The Persons with Disabilities Act of 2010 established statutory accessibility standards in public spaces throughout Tanzania. The legislation mandates that all new construction and major renovations incorporate barrier-free design, while explicitly prohibiting the denial of public services or physical access to persons with disabilities, a practice that has historically been quite widespread and deeply rooted in Tanzanian society.

Despite this legal framework, civil society advocates highlight a persistent gap between policy and practice. Infrastructure across urban centers, including the commercial capital, Dar es Salaam, remains largely inaccessible, characterized by public transport systems (such as daladalas and bodabodas) that lack adaptive features, uneven sidewalks, and steep stairs in public buildings. A notable exception is the Dar es Salaam Bus Rapid Transit (DART) system, which incorporated accessibility features such as wheelchair ramps, level-boarding platforms, and designated seating, contrasting with the country's broader transport network. Furthermore, PWD advocacy groups point out that disability policies often rely on a charity-based or welfare approach rather than an inclusive, rights-based model, leading to tokenistic inclusion in urban planning and weak enforcement mechanisms.

=== Visual impairment ===
Visual impairment and blindness constitute major public health challenges in Tanzania. Cataracts and uncorrected refractive errors remain the primary causes of vision loss, alongside glaucoma, diabetic retinopathy, and infectious eye diseases. According to data compiled by the International Agency for the Prevention of Blindness (IAPB), over 90% of sight loss cases in the country are preventable or treatable. Despite this, access to ophthalmic care is limited and heavily concentrated in urban centers. National health strategies, led by the Ministry of Health and Social Welfare, have prioritized the expansion of primary eye-care services, workforce training, and the prevention of blindness associated with non-communicable diseases, particularly diabetes. However, the eye-care system continues to face shortages of infrastructure, personnel, equipment and technology. These challenges extend beyond healthcare, with children with visual impairments facing significant barriers to education, including inaccessible school facilities and a shortage of specialized learning materials.

The Tanzania League of the Blind (TLB) is a national non-governmental organization representing people with visual impairments in Tanzania. Founded in 1964 by blind students at the Manoleo Vocational Training Center in Tabora, it advocates for equal rights and opportunities for people with visual impairments and promotes their access to education, vocational training, rehabilitation, and social inclusion.

=== Hearing impairment ===
Hearing impairment is another significant concern. A 2020 study of primary school children in the Kilimanjaro Region found hearing loss in 7.1% to 16.7% of children across three rural schools, with impacted earwax and otitis among the main possible causes. The study highlighted the need for improved identification, prevention and treatment of hearing impairment. More recent research has identified limited awareness and training among teachers as barriers to the early detection and support of pupils with hearing loss. A 2026 study in central Tanzania found that 70.9% of surveyed primary school teachers had poor knowledge of hearing loss, while 48.4% showed negative attitudes towards pupils with hearing loss.

Among older people, a study based on Tanzania's 2022 population census found that 7.5% of adults aged 60 and over reported hearing difficulties, with higher rates in rural areas. Although hearing aids are available through the health system, the World Health Organization reports that Tanzania has no national hearing-screening programme for older people, potentially limiting the identification and treatment of age-related hearing loss.

Tanzanian sign languages are a group of sign languages that developed independently among deaf students in separate schools in Tanzania from the 1960s. A standardized Tanzanian Sign Language (TSL) was proposed in 1984, but has not been officially implemented, and substantial variation remains among the country's sign languages.

=== Caregivers ===
Caregivers of children with disabilities in Tanzania face significant social, economic and psychological challenges. A 2024 study of caregivers in Dar es Salaam found that caring for children with disabilities was associated with a substantial burden of care, economic difficulties, social stigma and limited access to institutional support. The study, which involved women caregivers, most of them mothers, found that 62.5% showed signs of depression at the beginning of the study. All participants were unemployed, while 59% were the primary earners in their households, illustrating the economic difficulties faced by some caregivers.

The demands of caregiving can also restrict women's participation in employment and other income-generating activities. In 2026, the United Nations reported on support services in Dar es Salaam that enabled mothers of children with disabilities to work or pursue other economic activities while their children received care and therapy. The initiative, supported by UN Women and local organizations such as Dorcas Home Care Initiative, also provided caregivers with counselling and training in financial management and digital marketing.

== Paralympic and disability sport ==
Tanzania has a national Paralympic movement represented by the Tanzania Paralympic Committee, which is recognised by the International Paralympic Committee. The country made its Paralympic debut at the 1992 Summer Paralympics in Barcelona, but has historically sent small delegations and has yet to win a Paralympic medal. In recent years, efforts have been made to expand opportunities in para sport, including the development of para swimming and participation in international competitions for athletes with intellectual disabilities. In 2026, the Tanzania Paralympic Committee began preparations for the country's first National Para Games, intended to strengthen domestic competition and talent development ahead of the 2028 Summer Paralympics.
