= EAEC =

EAEC may refer to:

- European Automobile Engineers Cooperation, part of the Fédération Internationale des Sociétés d'Ingénieurs des Techniques de l'Automobile
- East African Examinations Council
- East Asia Economic Caucus, a regional free trade zone proposed in 1990
- Enteroaggregative Escherichia coli, a virulence property of Escherichia coli
- Eurasian Economic Community
- Edge Analytics and Edge Computing, see Edge Computing
- European Atomic Energy Community (Euratom) an international organisation which is legally distinct from the European Union, but has the same membership
