= Tanzania League of the Blind =

- Founded: 1964
- Founder: Students of Manoleo Vocational Training Center
- Type: Non-governmental organization
- Purpose: Advocacy, education, vocational training, rehabilitation, and social inclusion for people with visual impairments
- Location: Tanzania
- Origins: Tabora, Tanzania
- Region served: Nationwide
- Website: https://tlb.or.tz

The Tanzania League of the Blind (TLB) is a national non-governmental and non-profit organization representing people with visual impairments in Tanzania. Founded in 1964, it is one of the country's oldest disability-led associations, established shortly after independence to advocate for the rights and inclusion of blind and partially sighted persons. The League operates through more than one hundred district branches and claims a membership of over 35,000 individuals across the country.

== History ==
The origins of the organization can be traced to 1964, when a group of students at the Manoleo Vocational Training Center in Tabora came together to discuss the challenges faced by learners with visual impairments. Their concerns included unequal treatment by fellow students as well as discriminatory practices within the school administration. This meeting marked the beginning of a collective effort that would later develop into a national movement for the rights of blind and partially sighted people in Tanzania. Since then, the group gradually expanded beyond the vocational training center, attracting members from different parts of the country who shared similar experiences of exclusion. In 1972 it was formally registered with the Government of Tanzania as a non-governmental organization, giving it legal recognition and the ability to establish branches at the regional and district level. This formal status allowed the League to strengthen its advocacy work, build partnerships with national authorities, and begin providing structured support services for people with visual impairments across Tanzania.

By the end of the 1980s, TLB had established a nationwide presence, with many district branches, and had begun to consolidate its role as both a service provider and an advocate for rights of the visually impaired in Tanzania.

== Work ==
Its work focuses on promoting equal access to education, vocational training, health care, and employment for people with visual impairments. The organization also engages in public awareness campaigns to combat social stigma, provides mobility and rehabilitation support, and collaborates with both government and international partners on disability policy. Through these initiatives, the Tanzania League of the Blind seeks to improve quality of life and ensure the participation of blind and partially sighted citizens in Tanzanian society.

Another strand of their early work involved public policy engagement, where TLB sought to influence government regulations and curricula to be more inclusive. They lobbied for equal opportunities, including making vocational training accessible for blind learners and ensuring that educational institutions could accommodate students with visual impairments. Over time, the League also worked to secure a voice in national decision-making processes, participating in consultations on disability policy and contributing to the development of public strategies on education and social inclusion. Through these activities, TLB positioned itself not only as a service provider but also as an advocate for systemic change in Tanzania's approach to disability.

== See also ==
- Disability in Tanzania
