= East African Examinations Council =

East African testing agency

East African Examinations Council (EAEC) was a secondary-level testing agency of the East African Common Services Organisation (current East African Community). The East African Examinations Council Act, 1967 established it.

Zanzibar withdrew from the EAEC in 1970, and the Tanzanian Ministry of Education Curriculum and Examinations Section briefly took over examination proctoring for Mainland Tanzania when it withdrew from the EAEC in 1971. National Examinations Council of Tanzania (NECTA) is now the testing agency of Tanzania.
