= Richland Resources =

Richland Resources Ltd is a gemstone mining, development and exploration company who are listed on the London Stock Exchanges AIM market. (AIM:RLD)

Richland developed and operated TanzaniteOne Mining Ltd – the world's largest tanzanite gemstone mining company, based in Merelani, Tanzania from August 2004 until March 2015. The Company also developed a beneficiation division for the sale and export of cut gemstones while establishing a multi-level sales system for retailing ethically sourced gemstones to corporate and individual buyers. Richland's revenue peaked in 2004 at US$22.4 million. Richland Resources completed the sale of TanzaniteOne Mining to Sky Associates Group in March 2015.

Richland is also responsible for creating the Tanzanite Foundation in 2003 – a non profit organisation which is devoted to the education and promotion of the relatively new gemstone tanzanite. The Tanzanite Foundation also fundraised and facilitated for multiple community projects around the tanzanite mining area, including the building of new schools, scholarship programs and the building and up keep of a safe public road to the mining area.

In 2015 Richland entered into a new phase of operations at the Capricorn Sapphire mine site, located in central Queensland, Australia. With first production dated May 15, 2015 the company's strategy is to focus on the development of the Capricorn Sapphire mine as a new hub for ethically mined sapphire. The majority of Richland's sapphire are sold in bulk as rough, unpolished stones through a De Beers-style sightholder system.

Richland operates an online retail store, RichlandGemstones.com, which sells Australian sapphires and tanzanite gemstones and jewellery. Richland's tanzanite is sourced directly from their former mine, TanzaniteOne. The sapphires – which are typically "fancy sapphires" the name given to green, yellow and multi coloured sapphires – are mined by the company at Capricorn Sapphire Mine. The online store was previously named tanzaniteoneonline.com and was launched by Richland in 2013.
