= Human Development Innovation Fund =

- Founded: 2014
- Founders: DFID, Palladium International, KPMG
- Type: NGO
- Purpose: Innovation, Education, Healthcare, WASH
- Location: Dar es Salaam, Tanzania
- Method: Grants
- Endowment: GBP 40 million
- Website: hdif-tz.org

The Human Development Innovation Fund (also known as HDIF or HDIFtz or the Human Development Impact Fund) is a UKAid financed 40 million British Pound challenge fund providing grants to businesses, NGOs and research institutions for scaling innovations focused on the quality, value for money, and sustainability of basic services in education, health and water, sanitation and hygiene (WASH). HDIF was launched on May 12, 2014 with the support of the Vice President of Tanzania.

Among other honors received, in 2019 HDIF won the British Expertise award for best "International Collaborative Project."

According to DFID's business case for establishing the fund, the intended outputs of HDIF are testing and use of new innovations to manage and deliver basic human development services and enhance the evidence base and innovation ecosystem in Tanzania. HDIF supports the innovation ecosystem and government's roles in science, technology, and innovation through collaborations with Tanzania Commission for Science and Technology (COSTECH).

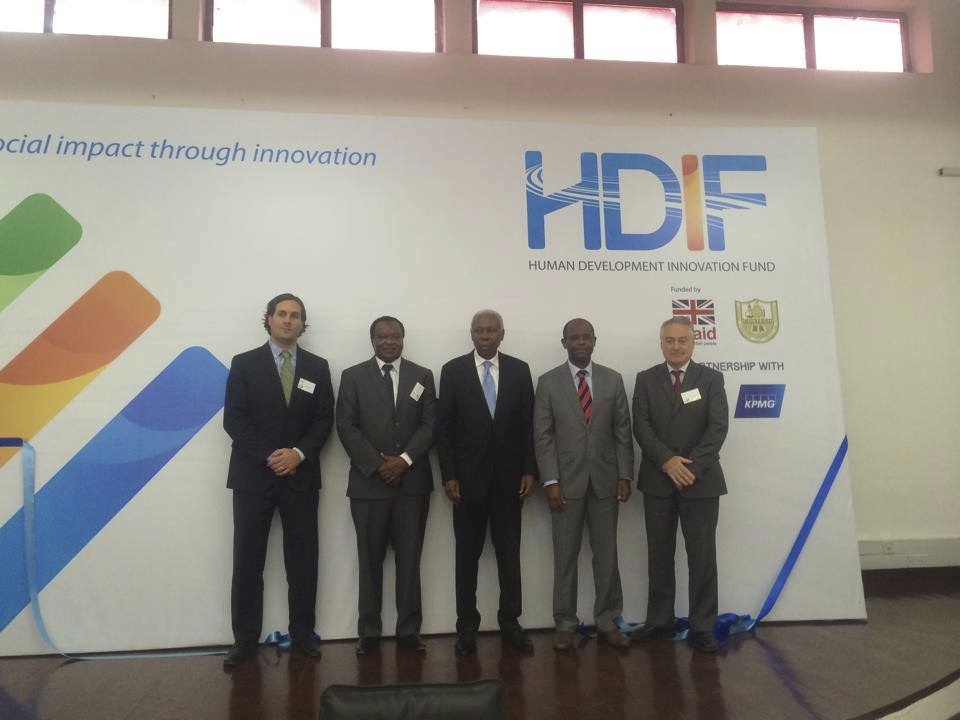
Launch event for HDIF, Dar es Salaam, Tanzania. Pictured (l to r): David B. McGinty, HDIF Team Leader; Dr. Hassan Mshinda, Director, COSTECH; Dr. Mohamed Gharib Bilal, Vice President, Tanzania; Dr. Prof. Makame Mbarawa, Minister, Ministry of Communication, Science and Technology; Marshall Elliott, Head, DFID Tanzania

Distinguishing factors of HDIF as a challenge fund include the long investment period compared to other challenge funds, which reflects the desired intent to scale early innovations.

HDIF closed on 31 July 2021 after more than seven years as a successful program. It is succeeded by the Funguo programme which was launched on 17 May 2021 at the opening ceremony of Innovation Week 2021.

== Innovation Week ==
In March 2015, HDIF curated the first annual Innovation Week in Tanzania, with open collaborative events on innovation and research, development, entrepreneurship, technology, and the arts. Collaborators in Innovation Week 2015 included KINU Innovation and Co-Creation Space, COSTECH, Ifakara Health Institute, Buni Innovation Hub, Nafasi Art Space, Deloitte Consulting, Institute of Management and Entrepreneurship Development (IMED), Tanzania Renewable Energy Business Incubator (TAREBI), and Tanzania Entrepreneurship and Competitiveness Centre (TECC).

From March 13, 2016 to March 19, 2016, HDIF convened the 2nd Annual Innovation Week in collaboration with DFID, COSTECH, BUNI Innovation Hub, KINU Innovation Hub, Deloitte, Nafasi Art Space, TAREBI, TASEF, NALEDI, NjeVenture, Ifakara Health Institute, Sauna Safari, Embassy of Finland, Archipelago and Palladium International.

A 3rd Annual Innovation Week took place from May 15–20, 2017. Participants in the event were "involved in creative storytelling, workshops for development, co-create an episode on innovation with Ubungo kids, listening to promising university's students led startups, explore research driven innovations by the Ifakara Health Institute and get an insight into development partner's donor funded approaches including the Principles for Digital Development."

The 4th annual Innovation Week took place from May 21-26, 2018 with the theme 'Innovation into Action'.

The 5th annual Innovation Week took place from March 25 - 29 2019 and was attended by over 2,000 people with the theme 'Scaling and Sustaining Innovation for Human Development'. Regional Innovation Week events were held in Arusha and Iringa.

Innovation Week 2020 was the 6th Innovation Week, the theme was 'Innovate for Impact' with the hashtags #Innovate4Impact and #IW2020. It took place from 8 - 13 March 2020 in Dar es Salaam and from 16 - 20 March Mbeya, Iringa, Stone Town (Zanzibar) Dodoma, and Arusha, some events were held online due to COVID-19. The full schedule of events can be found on https://www.timetickets.co.tz/iw2020dar .

Innovation Week Tanzania 2021 took place from 15 - 22 May 2021. Innovation Week 2022 is planned to be led by UNDP Tanzania through the Funguo Program.

== Recognition ==
HDIF has received recognition from The Guardian, The African Prosperity Report launch by Legatum, TanzICT, the Minister of Communication, Science and Technology of Tanzania, the Daily News, and the Center for Education Innovations. In April 2019 HDIF won the British Expertise International Award for Best International Collaborative Project.

Innovations supported by HDIF have received global recognition, including the use of drones for delivery of emergency medical supplies, nanofilters using a unique local business approach, and rats used to detect TB.

== Portfolio ==
HDIF's portfolio consists of Initial Investments, Round 1, Round 2, and Round 3. Additionally, HDIF launched the Mawazo Challenge in 2016 to support earlier stage ideas from Tanzanian youth to be prototyped and launched. Round 3 of funding launched on June 19, 2017, with submissions due on September 8, 2017. A final round of Institutional Capacity Building grants were signed in early 2020.

As of 2019, HDIF's investments include:

Organization	Partners	Sector	Stage
AMREF	GSK, Vodacom, GAVI	Health	Pilot
ANZA Entrepreneurs Ltd	Silverleaf Academies	Education	Pilot
APHFTA	Afya Micro-Finance	Health	Scale Up
APOPO	Operation ASHA (OpASHA), Mapambano ya Kifua Kikuu na Ukimwi Temeke (MKUTA)	Health	Scale Up
Bremen Overseas Research and Development Association Tanzania	Ifakara Health Institute Trust (IHI)	WASH	Scale Up
Camfed Tanzania	WorldReaders, KIVA, The Queen's Trust	Education	Pilot
Catholic Relief Services	Grundfos	WASH	Pilot
Comprehensive Community Based Rehabilitation in Tanzania (CCBRT)	Kabanga Hospital	Health	Pilot
Christian Social Services Commission (CSSC)	Studi Academy	Education	Pilot
Dageno Girls Center	-	Education	Scale Up
DIMAGI	PRINMAT, FHI360	Health	Pilot
Digital Opportunity Trust (DOT) Tanzania	Vocational Education Training Authority (VETA)	Education	Pilot
Elizabeth Glaser Pediatric Aids Foundation (EGPAF)	D-Tree International	Health	Scale Up
Fundación Paraguaya	MasterCard Foundation, University of Minnesota	Education	Pilot
Health Insurance Services Management Organization (HIMSO)	CIDR	Health	Pilot
Ifakara Health Institute Trust (IHI)	In2Care BV	Health	Pilot
Ifakara Health Institute Trust (IHI)	Zipline (formerly Romotive / Stork), University of Glasgow	Health	Pilot
Maji Safi kwa Afya Bora Ifakara Safe (MSABI)	Welldone, VisibleSolutions	WASH	Scale Up
Massachusetts General Hospital	JHPIEGO	Health	Scale Up
Muhimbili University	Deloitte	Health	Scale Up
Nelson Mandela African Institute of Science and Technology	Gongali Model Ltd, A to Z Industries	WASH	Scale Up
PharmAccess International (PAI)	Christian Social Services Commission, APHFTA	Health	Scale Up
Pyramid Pharma Limited	-	Health	Pilot
Ubongo Kids	Millicom EduMe	Education	Pilot
Sense International East Africa		Education	Pilot
Shirati Hospital	Bruyere Research Institute, Ottawa University, Medic Mobile, CPAR, Amref Health Africa	Health	Scale Up
Shule Direct	Eneza Education, Tigo	Education	Pilot
SimGas Tanzania	-	WASH	Pilot
SNV Netherlands Development Organisation	University of Twente, University of Dar es Salaam	WASH	Pilot
Sproxil	-	Health	Pilot
Stitching Investing in Children and their Societies (ICS)	Susteq	WASH	Pilot
TotoHealth Co. Limited	Wazazi Nipendeni SMS Service	Health	Scale Up
Vecna	Mnazi Mmoja Hospital Zanzibar, Tigo	Health	Pilot
Voluntary Service Overseas (VSO)	General Electric, Ifakara Health Institute	Health	Scale Up
World Vision Tanzania	Microsoft, Team4Tech, Techno Brain, University of Dar es Salaam, Vocational Education Training Authority (VETA), Ministry of Labor and Employment, TANAPA, Ngorongoro Conservation Area Authority	Education	Scale Up
D-tree International	-	Health	
Ubongo Learning Limited	-	Education	
Catholic Relief Services (CRS)	CARITAS, VETA, Mbeya Cement, Peoples’ Development Forum (PDF) and Local Government Authorities (LGAs)	WASH	
Dorcas Aid International Tanzania	Handeni Development Organization, Handeni District Council and AFRIpads	WASH	
HakiElimu	VIA University, Denmark and Mkwawa University College, Iringa	Education	
Well Told Story (T) Limited	-	WASH	
Karibu Tanzania Organization	Kisangara Institute of social work	Education	

== Partners ==
HDIF is funded by the United Kingdom's Department for International Development (DFID) through UKAid, managed by Palladium International (formerly known as GRM International) in consortium with KPMG, the Institute for Development Studies (IDS), Loughborough University, and Newcastle University.
