= TanzaniteOne =

TanzaniteOne (TanzaniteOne Mining Ltd) is a gemstone mining company which exclusively mines the blue gemstone, tanzanite. TanzaniteOne Mining Ltd is located in Block C, Merelani, Tanzania. Merelani is the world's only known source of tanzanite.

TanzaniteOne Mining Ltd was founded by Richland Resources, a gemstone development and mining company who were listed on the London Stock Exchanges AIM market (AIM:RLD) in 1994 . In 2014 TanzaniteOne was sold to a private company, Sky Associates, who are now the current owners.

The tanzanite resource is a long narrow area, divided into four blocks: named " A" to "D". TanzaniteOne Mining own the licence to mine the largest area Block C. Medium-scale mining is undertaken by Kilimanjaro Mining in Block A and Tanzanite Africa in Block D-extension. The Company’s neighbouring Blocks B and D are mined largely by thousands of artisanal miners who use non mechanised methods which do not allow them to mine as deep or as efficiently as Tanzanite One in C block. This poses a challenge for TanzaniteOne, notably in terms of undermining, whereby, the artisanal miners are mining into TanzaniteOne’s designated licence area to access deeper and better ventilated tunnels than their own. Ongoing security issues from the illegal mining and the lack of support from the local police and government agencies were stated as the major factor in the sale of TanzaniteOne by Richland Resources in 2015.

TanzaniteOne traditionally sell only rough gemstones to wholesale customers called "Sightholders", adopting a sales strategy which is based on the Debeers style of distribution where the sightholder companies are guaranteed a consistent bulk supply of the gemstone, but must purchase all quality grades of the gem as opposed to selecting the goods they require for production. The role of the sightholders is to process rough tanzanite and to manufacture jewellery. They have the ability to purchase large amounts of rough and have wholesale and retail distribution networks in place to facilitate the sale of loose tanzanite and finished jewellery.

In August 2013 TanzaniteOne announced they had opened an online boutique, www.tananiteoneonline, which sold tanzanite gemstones and tanzanite set gold jewellery. This is the first time the mining company has offered its gemstones to retail customers. In 2015 the website was renamed as richlandgemstones.com after Richland Resources sold TanzaniteOne.
