= Tanzanian sign languages =

Sign languages developed in Tanzania

Tanzanian Sign Language
- Native to: Tanzania
- Native speakers: 280,000 (2008)
- Language family: seven Deaf-community sign languages

Language codes
- ISO 639-3: tza
- Glottolog: tanz1238

Alphabets - Tanzanian Sign Language (TSL)

Around seven Tanzanian sign languages were independently developed among deaf students in separate Tanzanian schools for the deaf, starting in 1963. However, the use of several is forbidden by their respective schools. In 1984, a standardized Tanzanian Sign Language (TSL or LAT) was proposed by the Tanzania Association for the Deaf, using common or similar signs where these exist in schools that allowed research. However, it has not been officially implemented, and there remains little influence between the languages. A dictionary has been produced, while still several online resources, e.g. SignWiki, PDFs or YouTube videos, are published by different entities.

With TSL as with other languages, language standardization comes with some politics and issues of power involved. In 2019, the prime minister, when visiting the national celebrations of the International Week of the Deaf in Iringa, announced another program working on “Harmonization and Standardisation of Tanzanian Sign Language”. Since 2024 or slightly earlier, the Tanzania Institute of Education (a Government Institution under the Ministry of Education, Science and Technology) offers an online dictionary with videos aiming to aid standardization and training of teachers and interpreters.

Lexically, the variety that developed in the oralist deaf school in Tabora is significantly different from the dictionary and is under investigation.

The common Swahili term in Tanzania for these languages is lugha ya alama (ya Tanzania), meaning '(Tanzanian) sign language'. The term lugha ya bubu meaning 'mute/dumb language' is also used, but it is pejorative and offensive.

Different varieties of TSL (or total communication) are used as in so called "deaf units" of primary schools throughout Tanzania. The language is often acquired only when entering school. Secondary and tertiary education is seldom offered in (Tanzanian) Sign Language. There are different views on whether or how much deaf Tanzanians identify as (culturally) Deaf through their sign language use and community.

There is a lack of interpreters and sign language competent teachers, which often leads to many doubling in both functions. Since 2019, the University of Dar es Salaam offers a Certificate course in Tanzanian Sign Language and Interpretation.

== See also ==
- Disability in Tanzania
