= Education in Tanzania =

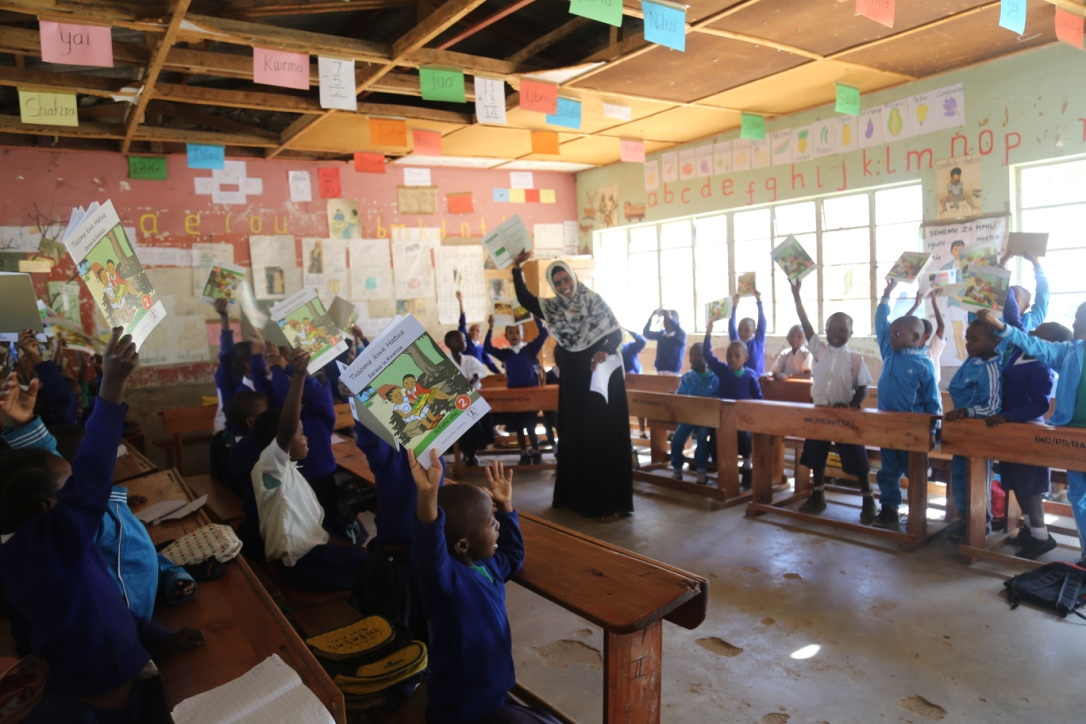
Children in Gangilonga Primary School

Education structure in Tanzania is provided by both the public and private sectors, starting with pre-primary education, followed by primary, secondary ordinary, secondary advanced, and ideally, university level education. Free and accessible education is a human right in Tanzania. The Tanzanian government began to emphasize the importance of education shortly after its independence in 1961. Curriculum is standardized by level, and it is the basis for the national examinations. Achievement levels are important, yet there are various causes of children not receiving the education that they need, including the need to help families with work, poor accessibility, and a variety of learning disabilities. While there is a lack of resources for special education, Tanzania has committed to inclusive education and attention on disadvantaged learners, as pointed out in the 2006 Education Sector Review AIDE-MEMORE. The government's National Strategy for Growth and Reduction of Poverty in 2005 heavily emphasized on education and literacy.

In 2016, the government introduced a fee free education policy for primary and secondary government schools.

The Human Rights Measurement Initiative (HRMI) finds that Tanzania is fulfilling only 57.0% of what it should be fulfilling for the right to education based on the country's level of income. HRMI breaks down the right to education by looking at the rights to both primary education and secondary education. While taking into consideration Tanzania's income level, the nation is achieving 79.0% of what should be possible based on its resources (income) for primary education but only 34.9% for secondary education.

== History ==
The Tanzanian government's commitment to education as an integral part of its social and economic development started shortly after independence. Before independence, educational access was very restricted. The Arusha Declaration was followed in 1967 by the policy document "Education for Self-Reliance", in which education was assigned a seminal role in the transformation of Tanzania to an African socialist society. Universal primary education (UPE) was emphasized in the Musoma Declaration of 1974 as a way of transforming rural society and agriculture, from which it was acknowledged the vast majority of the population would derive their livelihood.

By the early 1980s, external shocks (oil crises, low coffee prices, drought, and war between Tanzania and Uganda) and deficient economic policy caused an economic crisis that needed to be resolved through economic restructuring and recovery. Tanzania's relationship, however, with the World Bank and the International Monetary Fund (IMF) was tense because of differing perspectives on the root causes of the economic crisis and how to handle it. Tanzanian policy makers attributed the crisis to exogenous shocks, while the World Bank and the IMF stressed deficient economic policies and institutions as the root cause. For the education sector, this period saw a huge reduction in resources that lead to a reversal of progress made towards UPE during the 1970s and declining quantity and quality at all levels of education.

Despite subsequent progress from the economic reform efforts of the late 1980s and 1990s, social indicators were stagnating, including progress towards UPE. In 1995, the Ministry of Education prepared an Education and Training Master Plan. This was updated and further elaborated in a new phase of government policy embodied in the Education Sector Development Program (ESDP) of 1997 (revised in 2001), a program formulated to run from 1998 to 2007 and to have large scale impact that would accelerate progress on stagnating education indicators. The government also committed to the goals listed in the World Declaration on Education for All: Meeting Basic Learning Needs, which was issued in Jomtien, Thailand in 2000.

Within the larger ESDP, the government, together with civil society stakeholders and donors, formulated a Primary Education Development Program (PEDP) that took effect 2 January 2002 and ran to 2009. The World Bank supported the PEDP with a US$150 million Sector Adjustment Credit in 2001, which was supplemented by a US$50 million contribution by the Netherlands. The objectives of the PEDP were to: (1) expand school access; (2)improve education quality; and (3) increase school retention at the primary level. These objectives would be achieved through improved resource allocation and utilization, improved educational inputs, and strengthened institutional arrangements for effective primary education delivery. The PEDP introduced, among other reforms, Capitation and Development Grants for direct disbursement to primary schools.

The government's National Strategy for Growth and Reduction of Poverty (2005) had a focus on inclusive education as part of its second cluster that deals with social well being and quality of life. Teachers were encouraged to begin learning sign language and have special resources for "disadvantaged learners." Schools are beginning to focus on groups that have been traditionally excluded from education opportunities, regardless of physical, intellectual, social, or other condition within their environment.

== Public versus private education system ==
Tanzania's school system is catered towards the wealthy. Less than 30 percent of students achieve secondary education, and the language barrier between primary and secondary education is much of the issue. The language of education for primary school is Kiswahili while the language of secondary school is English. Many children have no prior experience with English, and there is typically no free extra or private help available. The country has been considering whether to standardize the language of instruction for the whole educational system. Around 60 percent of all teachers are under qualified, there is a lack of incentive and instructional materials, and many of the public schools are located in extremely poor areas. Private primary schools are very few, and they are English medium and expensive. Private secondary schools are also costly, more so even, but they often have a higher demand because children who do not pass the Primary School Leaving Exam after Standard 7 exam cannot enroll in a government secondary school. Private schools have smaller class sizes and better resources but charge tuition of around TSh 1.5 to 2 million per year, which is not feasible for the majority of families. The government is attempting to standardize the delivery of education and lower costs.

== Education sector national budget ==
For fiscal year 2011–12, which began 1 July 2011, the education sector national budget was TSH:2.283 trillion. In nominal terms, this was an 11.6 percent increase over the amount budgeted for fiscal year 2010–11. After accounting for inflation, however, the increase was approximately 1 percent.

Based on actual performance in recent fiscal years, the amount budgeted for the Ministry of Education and Vocational Training is typically much more than the amount spent. In fiscal year 2008–09, the ministry spent TSh 85.1 billion out of the TSh 128.5 billion budgeted. The gap between budgeted and spent has increased since then. In fiscal year 2010–11, the ministry spent only TSh 76.8 billion out of the TSh 139.7 billion budgeted.

A total of TSh 155.1 billion was spent in the last three years. This amount could be sufficient to build 3,875 houses for teachers according to the estimated costs of building one house at TSh 40 million as outlined by ... [phase 2 of the Secondary Education Development Program]. By building these houses we could have reduced the problem of teachers lacking accommodation, especially for schools situated in remote rural villages.

The education sector was budgeted to consume 20 percent of the national budget in fiscal year 2008–09. That share decreased to 17 percent in fiscal year 2011–12.

Funds budgeted in fiscal year 2011-12 for development, such as constructing buildings and teachers' houses, consumedonly 10.2 percent of the total amount budgeted for the education sector. This compared to 20-24 percent in Uganda and 14-15 percent in Kenya.

== Pre-primary education ==
In the Convention on the Rights of the Child, which Tanzania ratified in 1991, there are two arguments that emphasize the importance of Early Childhood Education. It argues that it should be a basic right for all young children and that it yields high economic returns for a nation's development. Tanzania was one of the first African countries to ratify this policy as well as a number of others such as the African Charter on the Rights and Welfare of the Child. While they are progressive and see pre-primary education as a basic right, it is not mandatory and is up to parents whether or not their child attends before the age of five. There is low public awareness about the importance of early education, especially in rural communities. It is accessible to about 40% of pre-primary aged children, and the government is not currently making strides to increase this. About 8.6% of teachers in pre-primary education are professionally qualified, and nutrition, physical health, and mental health, are not priorities of the system. The curriculum focuses on teachers delivering curriculum in numeracy and literacy, with little room for feedback, questions, or more 'creative learning' such as storytelling, art, or peer interaction.

== Primary education ==
=== Enrollment and teaching statistics ===
The Arusha Declaration in 1967 provided for Tanzania to adopt a community-based learning education system, where each area, regardless of its wealth or urban or rural character, assesses its own needs and makes appropriate policies to meet them. Primary education is compulsory and free, except for school supplies. and taught in Kiswahili if through the public system. As mentioned, private primary education is English medium and much more expensive.

In 2014, about 8,247,000 children in Tanzania were enrolled in primary education, which is about 80 percent of total pupils above age 7 and up to age 18. In 2023, 93.07% of all children of primary school age were enrolled in primary education. This was an increase by 8.4% percent in 2020/21 compared to 2014/15. As enrollment increased with accessibility, educational quality decreased. The number of classrooms were too low, especially in rural areas, often causing 100-200 students to be in one classroom, and at ten government schools, there was only one teacher to teach them. Teacher to student ratio was, on average, 1:50.63, and primary school completion rate in 2023 was 86.23. There were 99.20% trained teachers in primary education.

=== Standard primary curriculum ===
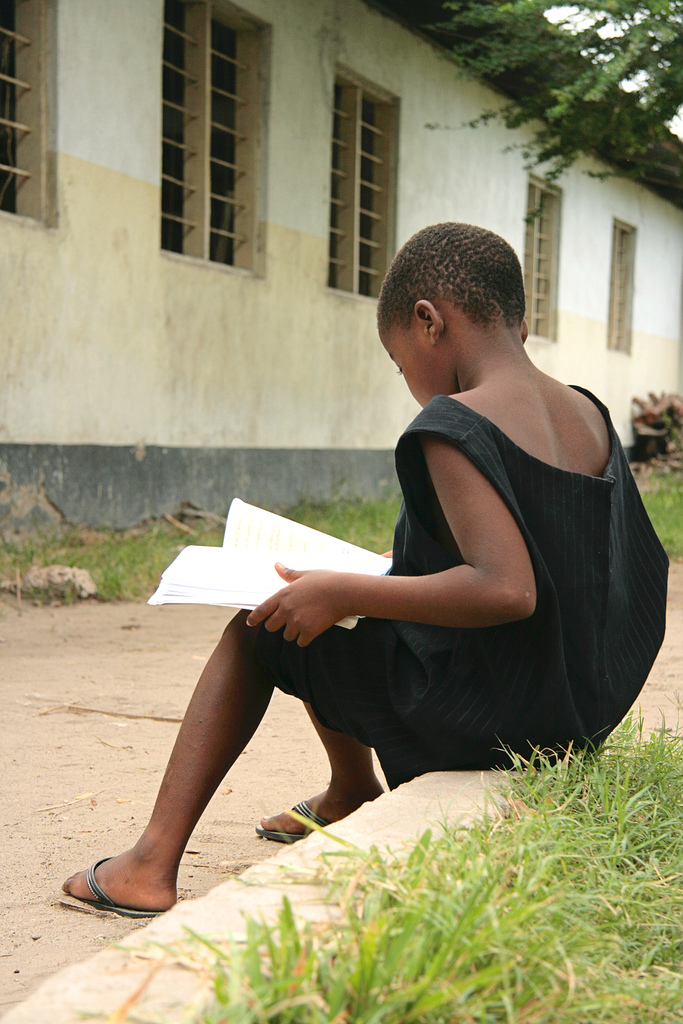
A child immersed in reading a book.

The Tanzania Institute of Education is the main body responsible for developing the curriculum. It prepares programs, syllabi, and pedagogical materials such as handbooks and laboratory manuals. It also specifies standards for educational materials, trains teachers in curriculum innovations, monitors curriculum implementation in schools, and evaluates and approves manuscripts intended for school use.

The curriculum is composed of twelve subjects: Kiswahili, Mathematics, Science, Geography, Civics, History, English language, French, Religion, Information and Communication Technology, and school sports. Cultural activities include poetry, drama, music, art, and sports. The focus of the curriculum is the development of the following competencies among learners: critical and creative thinking, communication, numeracy, technology literacy, personal and social life skills, and independent learning. Agriculture has also been added to the curriculum, especially in rural areas, which is helpful in getting into the job market after schooling. Kiswahili only became the official language of primary education in 1968 after Tanzania's independence, and this led to much linguistic discontinuity between primary and secondary education. Unless children are enrolled in private primary education which is taught in English, language comes as a barrier to pursuing higher education.

=== National examinations and achievement rates ===
Until 1973, a student was required to pass the National Standard 4 Exams to continue to Standard 5. The exams are still given even though passing is no longer required. The pass rate was 70.6 percent in 2001, 88.7 percent in 2003, and 78.5 percent in 2007.

Under current law, a student must pass the Primary School Leaving Examination at the end of Standard 7 to receive a primary school certificate and be eligible to attend public secondary school. In 2009, 49.4 percent of the 999,070 students who sat for these exams received passing marks. The pass rate had declined from over 70 percent in 2006. The Dar es Salaam Region had the highest pass rate (69.8 percent) while the Shinyanga Region had the lowest (31.9 percent). There was a significant disparity in the national pass rate for males (55.6 percent) versus females (43.2 percent). This disparity existed to some degree in every region except the Kilimanjaro Region. Of those who passed the exam in 2009, 90.4 percent were selected to join public secondary schools for the year 2010. There was not enough room in those schools to accommodate everyone who passed.

In 2007, 89.9 percent of children in Standard 6 on the Tanzanian mainland were at or above reading level 4, "independent reading", which was second highest among the 14 countries and regions in southern and eastern Africa where this data was available (Botswana 75.8 percent, Kenya 80.2 percent, Lesotho 47.5 percent, Malawi 8.3 percent, Mauritius 78.9 percent, Mozambique 56.5 percent, Namibia 61.3 percent, Seychelles 78.0 percent, South Africa 51.7 percent, Swaziland 93.0 percent, Zambia 27.3 percent, Zanzibar 78.6 percent, and Zimbabwe 62.8 percent). Although only 56.9 percent of those children were at or above mathematics level 4, "beginning numeracy", that was fifth highest among those countries and regions (Botswana 43.6 percent, Kenya 61.7 percent, Lesotho 18.9 percent, Malawi 26.7 percent, Mauritius 78.9 percent, Mozambique 30.8 percent, Namibia 18.4 percent, Seychelles 57.7 percent, South Africa 30.8 percent, Swaziland 55.7 percent, Zambia 8.2 percent, Zanzibar 52.3 percent, and Zimbabwe 62.8 percent)

In 2007, the pupil reading score of 577.8 for Standard 6 children on the Tanzanian mainland was the highest among the 15 countries and regions in southern and eastern Africa where this data was available. Their pupil mathematics score of 552.7 was the third highest, behind only Mauritius and Kenya.

However, curriculum and success is relative. According to UNICEF, results from 2014 primary education leaving exams revealed that only 8 percent of students in second grade were able to properly read and do basic math like adding and subtracting. Less than 0.1 percent showed competency in life skills such as self-confidence, grit, and problem solving.

== Secondary education ==
=== Levels ===
Secondary education has two levels. Ordinary Level (O' Level) is Form 1 through Form 4. After Form 4, a certificate is issued to all passing the Certificate of Secondary Education Examination (Tanzania). Selected students may progress to Advanced Level (A' Level) education - Forms 5 and 6 - or study for an ordinary diploma in a technical college. Not all schools offer A' Level classes. All students at this level are boarding students. Because of the potential problems associated with boarding both male and female students, A' Level schools restrict enrollment to one sex.

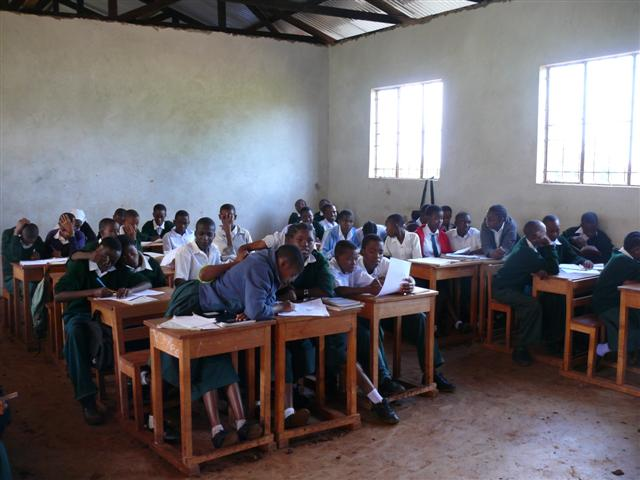
Students busy studying at the Msaranga Secondary School.

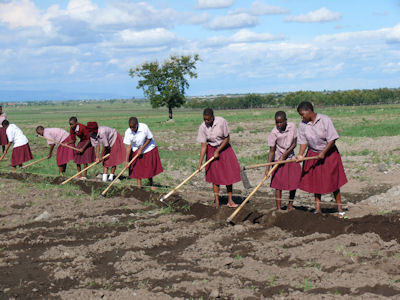
A group of students tending the school crops whilst receiving agricultural training.

=== Enrollment and teaching statistics ===
As of 2021, Tanzania counted over 11.1 million students enrolled in primary schools. Enrollment in public and private primary institutions has been increasing in the country. For instance, in 2016, there were around 8.6 million enrolled in primary education. Similarly, the number of primary schools in Tanzania has been following an upward trend.

In 2008, the total enrollment in Forms 1-4 was 1,164,250 students, and in Forms 5–6 it was 58,153 students. The total number of teachers was 32,835 and the total number of schools was 3,485. In the same year, the gross enrollment rate for Forms 1–4 was estimated at 36.2 percent, and the net enrollment rate was estimated at 24.4 percent. The figures for Form 5 and 6 were 4.0 percent and 1.4 percent, respectively.

In 2012, the total enrollment in Forms 5–6 was 78,438 students. The total number of teachers was 65,086.

In 2014, almost 70% of children between the ages 14–17 were not enrolled in education, and only 3.2% of them are enrolled by the time the final two years of secondary school comes around.

The secondary schools that perform highest in the national examinations employ better-trained teachers, including experienced graduates. Higher pay and efficient school management attract the higher qualified teachers to non-government schools and seminaries. Of all teachers who have a university degree, 58 percent work in non-government schools, and of all Bachelor of Arts and Bachelor of Science graduates with education degrees, 75 percent are absorbed in this sector. Most of the rest teach in government schools, with the result that very few are in the community-built schools.

The government, in order to try and increase secondary education attendance, is providing free education for the first four years of secondary school, though quality at each school varies. Additionally, while secondary education often faces a dramatic drop in females because of the financial burden, Tanzania has reached gender parity in enrollment. One-third of girls are still married by age 18, and most of them come from poorer families.

=== Curriculum and student activities ===
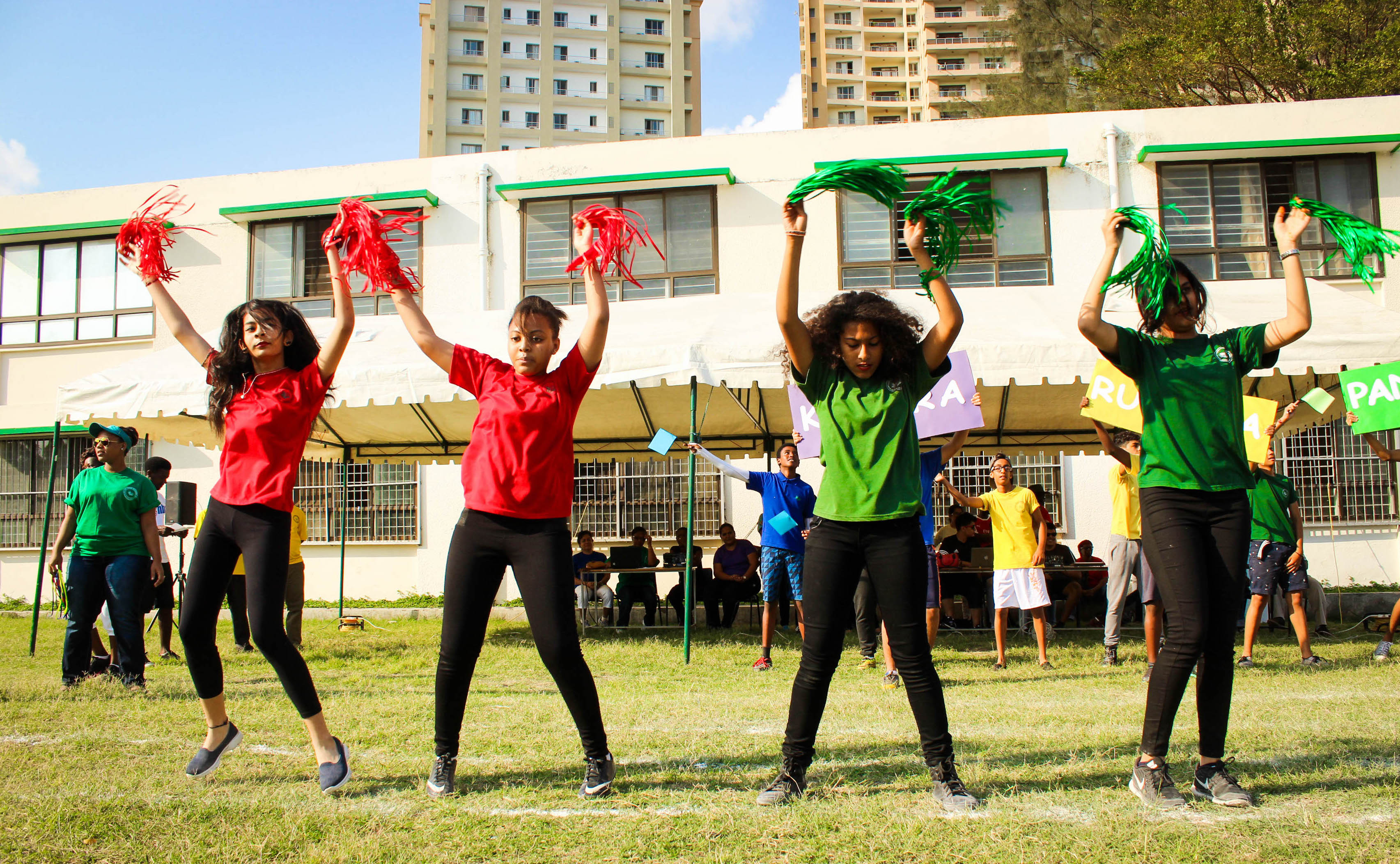
Students cheering during an athletic event.

As mentioned before, English is the official language of secondary school, both private and public, which leads to challenges for the majority of students that come from Kiswahili focused primary schools. In 2009, only 35.4% of students passed the English portion of the National Standard 7 Exam, but this does not affect their ability to go to secondary schools. English in secondary schools is extremely controversial because while some people believe that students will become prepared to understand the global economy, many others believe that the focus on other subjects drops because a significant portion of time goes into learning English. If communication is not possible and questions are difficult to ask, it is difficult to retain information and critically think.

The core and compulsory subjects in Forms 1 and 2 that are offered by all schools include Mathematics, English, Physics, Chemistry, Kiswahili, Biology, History, Geography, Civics and Religion. The optional subjects in Forms 1 and 2 include Home Economics, Information and Computer Studies, additional Mathematics, Music, Fine Arts, foreign languages, Islamic studies, Bible knowledge, and physical education. Students may choose none or any one or two of the listed subjects if offered at their school.

The core subjects in Form 3 and 4 offered by all schools include Mathematics, English, Kiswahili, Biology, Civics, Religion, History, Geography, Physics, and Chemistry. The optional subjects in Form 3 and 4 include Home Economics, Information and Computer Studies, additional Mathematics, Music, Fine Arts, French, Arabic, Islamic Studies, Bible knowledge, and physical education.

Tanzania reemphasized the value of sports like soccer in 2009, and in addition to that, debate and religious groups are popular after school activities. Parents and teachers have slowly began to value these activities in the development and growth of students.

=== National examinations ===
A national standardized exam is given at the end of Form 2, although there is no consequence for failing it.

Another national standardized exam, the Certificate of Secondary Education Examination, is given at the end of Form 4. A student who passes is given a school-leaving certificate by his or her school. The student is also given an academic certificate by the National Examination Council of Tanzania. This certificate indicates the student's level of performance in several subjects, with division I being the best performance and division IV being the worst.

Secondary education ends when a student passes the Advanced Certificate of Secondary Education Examination and receives a diploma after completing Form 6. Depending on the test results, the student may then be selected to enroll in a university.

About 3% of students actually complete secondary education, and even less make it to the university level. Youth unemployment rate is about 6.5%, with more females struggling to find jobs than men. About 90% of Tanzania's economy remains to be agriculture.

== Special needs education ==
=== Cultural history and stigma ===
While about 7.9% of Tanzania's population lives with disability, less than 1% of children enrolled in pre-primary, primary, or secondary education have a disability. Similarly to many other Sub-Saharan African countries, Tanzania has no system set in place to assess children for physical or mental impairments before they enroll in the education system, and there is a huge gap in knowledge about how to improve access to education for disabled students when many of their disabilities are not known or tested. Disabled individuals in traditional society and culture are often at a disadvantage in social relationships and economic status. The majority of the country is religious, primarily Muslim or Christian, and in history, that has been used as justification to not include disabled individuals in "normal society." However, aside from the state and some NGOs, religious organizations are also offering education for people with disabilities. In 1950, the Church Missionary Society of Tanzania opened a school for students with visual disabilities. Teachers were trained abroad and centered curriculum around the students, although up until this point, there had never been a separate learning environment for students with disabilities. Many students were and still are forced to stay at home due to superstition, stigma, and ignorance, and they are, consequently, often seen as worthless or as a burden. While street polling in Arusha Region showed an overwhelming majority of 95% agreeing that children with disabilities (here: deaf) should be schooled like everyone else, parents were reported to often prioritize able-bodied children, as free school still comes with costs for e.g. uniforms or transport.

Since the 1950s, the Tanzanian government has implemented multiple development plans and has incorporated programs for students with auditory and physical disabilities, but there are still issues of teachers not having proper training in this area.

=== Deaf and Hard-of-Hearing Learners ===
Published research about deaf people in Tanzania and their education is limited. 0.62 percent of the Tanzanian population can be categorized as functionally deaf (i.e., roughly 360,000 people nationwide). A calculation for Arusha Region finds that only 9 percent - or probably less - of deaf learners that should currently be attending the first seven years of primary school (at a school with deaf units) in the Region are doing so. At these schools in Tanzania, it is common that learners spend two years each in Standard 1, 3 and 5, resulting in 10 instead of 7 years primary school. As of 2019, Tanzania had 12 primary schools for the deaf, as well as 236 deaf units (214 day schools and 22 boarding schools). However, a deaf unit can range from schools with several signing (special education) teachers to school where in fact no teacher knows a relevant level of sign language. Attending primary schools with TSL-competent teachers is described as positive and liberating by deaf people, often the first chance to acquire language skills and have meaningful conversations. However, secondary school - usually without any sign language - is described as a time to endure by deaf Tanzanians.

Deaf schools and units often serve as important 'deaf spaces' for the community.

Deaf people attending tertiary education is still rare. Their experience and success depends largely on whether the respondents went to a regular university/college or whether they went to one of the three universities offering some special services for the deaf: UDSM, DUCE & SEKOMU.

=== Effects of malnutrition ===
Malnutrition frequently leads to cognitive disorders and issues with motor development at a young age. In the majority of sources discussing special education in developing countries, malnutrition is pointed out to be a major cause of these challenges. While most malnutrition-related neurological disorders are preventable, people are not often educated and aware of this, and a lack of vitamins and other nutrients can not be diagnosed with no regular healthcare checkups or system. In Tanzania, 34% percent of children under the age of 5 suffer from chronic malnutrition, and 58% of children in the same age range suffer from anemia. While malnutrition can lead to lack of curiosity or attention span and affects many Tanzanian schoolchildren, it can also lead to deficiencies that cause visual blindness, delayed mental development, retardation, peripheral neuropathy, and nerve sensitivities. According to a report from the World Health Organization, children with disabilities are 3.7 times more likely to be victims of any sort of violence, whether physical or sexual, and children with mental impairments are the most vulnerable. Because the education system for most of the nation's history did not accommodate these children, the alternative to staying home was often attending school and experiencing bullying or isolation that was not conducive to learning.

=== Language impairment and speech deficits ===
Due to cultural influence and lack of adequate educational testing, children with language impairments are often diagnosed much later on than average. Language impairment can be caused by other cognitive disorders, through social and environmental factors, or through a variety of other disorders like cleft lip. Language impairment often affects psychosocial development as well as the capability of a child to be educated around people at their level and at their pace. Teachers are not often prepared to alter their curriculum with children that cannot follow the way that they are teaching, but it is better if children are diagnosed at the pre-primary level so that they can begin training and practice at a young age. It is especially difficult in the public secondary education system because of the language change from Kiswahili to English, which is a significant transition for the average student. Tanzania faces a shortage of speech-language pathologists and therapists, and because there is no individualized training in the disorders and speech deficits are typically not the same in two people (perception, production, etc.), it is hard to have an effective curriculum solution. . The growing tip for education in Tanzania Tanzania institute of education ( TIE) especially in 2025 published a new education platform called Opschool it help students learn well, The Tanzania Institute of Education (TIE) provides an official online secondary school platform designed to help students from Form One to Form Six access learning materials through the internet. This platform offers digital textbooks, interactive lessons, videos, and audio resources that follow the national curriculum, making it easier for students across Tanzania to study from anywhere. Since TIE is the government body responsible for developing and approving school syllabi and textbooks, all the materials in the online school are official, reliable, and aligned with NECTA requirements. The online system helps students who may not have access to physical books or strong school resources by giving them a modern way to learn using a phone, tablet, or computer. Through this platform, learners can review subjects, watch lessons, and use up-to-date TIE books completely online, making secondary education more flexible and accessible, especially for those in remote areas.

=== Moving to an inclusive curriculum ===
With all of this considered, Tanzania has become one of the most progressive nations in Africa to implement special needs policy. Their policy on Disability as of 2002 emphasized that educators should be well versed on identifying students' developmental needs and being able to create a curriculum and classroom setting that is inclusive. While they have pledged to create training centers for these skills, there is still debate on whether enough action has been taken or if it has all been unimplemented policy. Religion and stigmatization of disability still exist and play a key role in the progress of the issue. However, Tanzania does seem to pride the progression from segregation, to integration, and now to inclusivity. Organizations for disabled individuals and allies have been developed, schools are becoming more inclusive so that all children can bond over experience and build relationships, and families have support groups that they may part take in. Recently, policy change has been progressive.

== See also ==
- List of schools in Tanzania
- List of universities in Tanzania
