= Palladium International =

Advisory and management corproration

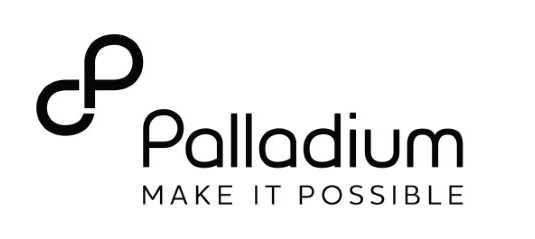

Palladium (also known as "The Palladium Group", "Palladium Holdings" or "Palladium International") is an international development sector advisory, management and implementation firm, representing the combination of seven prior companies: GRM International, Futures Group, Palladium, the IDL Group, Development & Training Services, HK Logistics and CARANA Corporation. As of October 2016, Palladium employs over 2,500 persons operating in 90 countries. At the end of 2015, Palladium International was the fourth-largest private sector partner for the UK Government's Department for International Development (DFID). During 2011, Palladium International members Futures Group and Carana were USAID's fourteenth and sixteenth largest private sector partners, respectively. At the end of 2012, GRM International was the third largest private sector partner for AusAID.

== Notable initiatives ==
Palladium International is active in the expansion of social innovation including impact bonds, impact investing, and shared value. Select initiatives of Palladium Group include:

- Utkrisht Development Impact Bond (DIB) in Rajasthan, India
- The SPRING Accelerator, a human centered design-based programme
- The Human Development Innovation Fund, an Enterprise Challenge Fund
- Innovation for Indonesia’s School Children (INOVASI)
- Innovation Impact Framework, Execution Premium Process (XPP) and Balanced Scorecard
- IQCare (International Quality Care)
- Financing Ghanaian Agriculture Project (FinGAP)

In 2015, the firm announced the formation of the Positive Impact Research Institute to explore current and future trends in the Impact Economy and the affiliated Let's Make It Possible nonprofit organization.

== Subsidiaries ==
Subsidiaries of Palladium Group include:

- Enclude, acquired in 2018 from Triodos Ventures, an independent fund managed by Triodos Bank
- Palladium Consulting India Private Limited (PCIPL), established in 2015, is a joint venture of the Palladium Group with AP Globale. The CEO of PCIPL is Amit Patjoshi.

Notable persons affiliated with Palladium Group include:

- Robert S. Kaplan, co-founder, Harvard University Professor, and co-creator of the Balanced Scorecard
- David P. Norton, co-founder and co-creator of the Balanced Scorecard
- George Serafeim, Harvard Business School Professor
- Julie Bishop, Palladium board member and former Australian Minister for Foreign Affairs
- Ann Sherry, Palladium board member, chief executive officer of Carnival Australia, and former public servant
- John Eales, Palladium board member, hall of fame rugby player, and businessman
- Alonzo Fulgham, Palladium board member and former Acting Administrator of the United States Agency for International Development (USAID)
- Kerry Packer (deceased), former Palladium board member and billionaire media magnate
- Sir William Archer Gunn (deceased), Palladium (formerly GRM International) founder
- Theodore J. Gordon (The Futures Group founder)
- Shamel Antonio Matutes son of Abel Matutes owner of palladium group he works as head investor project and development...
