= National Examinations Council of Tanzania =

Test proctoring organization

Coordinates: 6.7691568°S 39.2370892°E

National Examinations Council of Tanzania (NECTA; Swahili: Baraza la Mitihani la Tanzania) is an agency of the Tanzanian government, headquartered in Dar Es Salaam, that proctors tests given nationally.

It manages the Standard Four National Assessment (SFNA), Primary School Leaving Examination (PSLE), Form Two National Assessment (FTNA), Qualifying Test (QT), Certificate of Secondary Education Examination (CSEE), Advance Certificate of Secondary Education Examination (ACSEE), Grade A Teachers Certificate Exam (GATCE), Grade A Teachers Special Course Certificate Examination (GATSCCE), Diploma in Technical Examination (DTE), and Diploma in Secondary Education Examination (DSEE).

== History ==
It was established on 21 November 1973. Prior to that time the East African Examinations Council (EAEC) served Mainland Tanzania and Zanzibar. The latter withdrew from the EAEC in 1970, and the Ministry of Education (MoE) Curriculum and Examinations Section briefly took over examination proctoring for Mainland Tanzania when it withdrew from the EAEC in 1971. The Tanzanian government began hiring employees for NECTA in 1971, and Parliamentary Act No. 21 of 1973 established NECTA.

== Website ==
- National Examinations Council of Tanzania
