= Enterprise Challenge Fund =

The Enterprise Challenge Fund (ECF) for the Pacific and South-East Asia was a A$20.5 million pilot program funded by Australia (through AusAID) commencing in July 2007 that ran for six years, concluding in October 2013. It provided A$11.012 million in grants to help commercialize innovative business ideas in low-income markets, with a focus on innovative solutions that addressed market failures. It ran through competitive rounds and was overseen by a private sector board. 21 businesses were funded. It used a challenge fund model and called for proposals in multiple rounds.

A$11.012 million was granted to 22 projects in Cambodia, East Timor, Fiji, Laos, Papua New Guinea, southern Philippines, Solomon Islands and Vanuatu.

== See also ==
- AusAID
- Private Sector Development
