= Advance Certificate of Secondary Education Examination (Tanzania) =

School examination in Tanzania

The Advance Certificate of Secondary Education Examination (ACSEE) is an academic A Level examination that is done by Form Six students (12th grade) across Tanzania to prepare them for their University studies. The exams are usually done between late September to early or mid May and they are managed by the National Examinations Council of Tanzania (NECTA). Students are required to obtain three credits in order to pass the exams. The ACSEE exams also known as form six, can obtain their results through the official NECTA website which the results are normally released on the month of July, so as to allow other activities such students loan application (HESLB) and university applications.
