= Miss Geek Africa =

Miss Geek Africa is an entrepreneurship competition that originated as Miss Geek Rwanda in 2014, but was renamed Miss Geek Africa in 2017 and has expanded to 22 countries in Africa. Girls and women between the ages of 13 and 25 submit apps that solve problems through technological innovations. The top three competitors receive cash prizes and business training, and the winner also receives financial backing.

== History ==
The Miss Geek Africa competition was originally created as Miss Geek Rwanda, with the first winner being crowned in 2014. It expanded to become Miss Geek Africa in 2017 and began accepting applications from 16 additional African countries. In 2018, it had 22 participating countries. The contest was created to inspire girls in Africa to solve challenges in the continent using technology and to encourage them to pursue careers in science, technology, engineering, and mathematics. Girls and women between the ages of 13 and 25 submit technological innovations in the form of apps to the competition. The top three competitors receive cash prizes and all finalists receive business training. The winner also receives financial backing to help her realize her innovation. Girls in ICT Rwanda organizes the event.

== Winners ==
Miss Geek Africa

- 2018 - Salissou Hassane Latifa from Niger - Created Saro App, a "First Responder" app that helps emergency services get basic first aid information before medical staff arrive at the scene.
- 2017 - Ruth Njeri Waiganjo from Kenya - "Safe Drive" app designed to intelligently protect road users from accidents.

Miss Geek Rwanda

- 2016 - Rosine Mwiseneza - designed irrigation app for farmers that monitors the wetness of the soil and uses switches to automatically water crops when soil is dry
- 2015 - Vanessa Mutesi - designed idea for application called ‘Rwanda Online Open School’ which had resources for students and promoted self-teaching
- 2014 - Nancy Sibo - developed app for farmers which monitors the gestation period and milk productivity of cows
