= Zarina Ahmad =

Scottish climate justice advocate

Zarina Ahmad is the Climate Change and Environment Officer at the Council for Ethnic Minority Voluntary Organisation, Scotland (CEMVO Scotland) and an advocate for climate justice.

== Career ==
From 1986 to 1990, Ahmad studied for a BSc in psychology at the University of Glasgow. While at the university she was president of the society of Asian Students. Immediately after graduation she worked as an accountant and book-keeper. She then went on to work for Fife Education where her role was to determine whether a child's learning difficulties were due to an undiagnosed learning problem or poor knowledge of the English language.

When Ahmad managed a Scottish Climate Challenge Funded project in 2009, she realised that people from an ethnic minority background were not well represented at conferences and other meetings about environmental projects. Her personal background and experience led to her to advocate for climate justice and diversity within environmental movements.

Since 2013 she has been the Climate Change and Environment Officer at the Council for Ethnic Minority Voluntary Organisations, Scotland. The Council is an intermediary between organisations and the Scottish Government. Ahmad was appointed at a time when a Scottish Government report indicated that in the past four years only three ethnic minority groups had applied for funding on climate change issues from the Scottish Climate Challenge Fund, administered by Keep Scotland Beautiful. Ahmad considered that lack of knowledge, rather than lack of interest was the reason. She organised a conference where minority ethnic organisations and Scottish Government representatives could meet, and also provided advice and mentorship.

As a result, between 2013 and 2020, over 100 minority ethnic organisations have successfully applied to the Scottish Climate Challenge Fund. Some of the funded projects are small, others large and long-term, but the personal knowledge of climate change of many people in the organisations meant that they were keen to become involved.

In 2015 Ahmad contributed to a Scottish Parliament enquiry into barriers to employment caused by race and ethnicity.

Ahmad speaks on climate justice and social and racial inequality at events such as Scottish Interfaith Week 2015 and an interfaith event in Glasgow in February 2020, a joint Chatham House and Glasgow Caledonian University research event in July 2020. She was a member of a discussion panel on feminist perspectives on climate change at a European Union-funded conference in September 2020.

Ahmad runs the Ethnic Minority Environmental Network that provides training in environmental activism, from the point of view of social and climate justice.

== Awards ==
- In November 2020 she was included in the BBC Radio 4 Woman's Hour Power list 2020.
