= Tanzania Commission for Science and Technology =

Parastatal organization

The Tanzania Commission for Science and Technology (COSTECH) is a parastatal organization affiliated with the government of Tanzania. It was created by an Act of the National Assembly of Tanzania in 1986 as a successor to the Tanzania National Scientific Research Council. The commission was a subsidiary institution to the Ministry of Communications, Science and Technology (MCST) and is now a subsidiary institution to the Ministry of Education, Science & Technology. The main offices are located in Dar es Salaam.

COSTECH is currently led by Dr. Amos Nungu, who formerly served as Assistant Director of Science, Technology and Innovation at the Ministry of Education, Science and Technology].

== Function ==
The function of COSTECH is that of "co-ordinating and promoting research and technology development activities in the country." COSTECH is the "chief advisor to the Government on all matters pertaining to science and technology and their application to the socio-economic development of the country." Government-funded science activity in the country is governed by the commission, and its duties include the administration of research grants, maintenance of research registry and science information services, setting research policy, and creating incentives for invention and innovation. Areas of activity include the Internet, biotechnology, energy, telecommunications, the development of multimedia teaching material, and more.

COSTECH works with corporations, universities, and other parastatals, including the Tanzania Industrial Research and Development Organization and the Tanzania Traditional Energy Development and Environment Organization.

== Affiliates ==
=== Governmental ===
In addition to numerous collaborating organizations, sister subsidiary institutions of COSTECH under the MCST include:

- Tanzania Atomic Energy Commission(TAEC)
- Tanzania Commission for Science and Technology
- Tanzania Communication Regulatory Authority
- Dar es Salaam Institute of Technology
- Mbeya University of Science and Technology
- Arusha Technical College

=== Non-governmental ===
- Dar Teknohama Business Incubator (DTBi), led by Engineer George Mulamula
- Human Development Innovation Fund (HDIF), led by David B. Mcginty, Palladium International (formerly known as GRM Futures Group) with KPMG
- TANZICT, a bilateral collaboration between the Ministry of Communications, Science and Technology of Tanzania MCST and Ministry for Foreign Affairs of Finland
- Buni Innovation Hub, Innovation space (tech space) focusing on Innovation and Technology Entrepreneurship bridging the skills gap in Tanzanian youths by conducting several programmes, activities and events. They create competent youths for the local incubation and acceleration programmes. The program has been led by Jumanne Mtambalike and Brian Paul the hub managers since 2013.

== See also ==
- Science and technology in Tanzania
- Ministry of Communication, Science and Technology of Tanzania
