= Mastercard Foundation =

International non-governmental organization

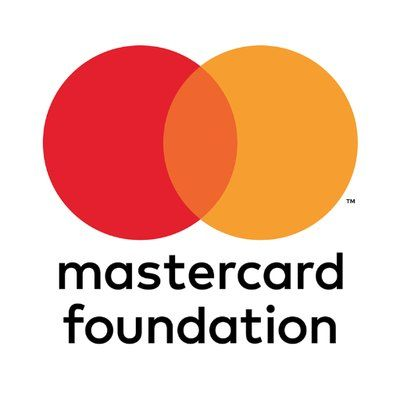
- Founded: 2006; 20 years ago
- Type: Charitable organization, NGO
- Location: Toronto, Ontario, Canada
- Region served: Worldwide
- Board Chair: Zein Abdalla
- Key people: Sewit Ahderom (president and CEO)
- Website: Mastercardfdn.org

The Mastercard Foundation is an international non-governmental organization established by Mastercard in 2006. It is the wealthiest charitable foundation in Canada, and one of the wealthiest in the world, with 2024 assets of $47 billion.

The organization, which is based in Toronto, Ontario, has supported work in 49 countries. In 2018, Mastercard Foundation shifted to a specific focus on Africa, through its Young Africa Works strategy.

The foundation develops programs primarily focused on reducing gender and economic inequality, expanding access to quality education, increasing the opportunities for decent work, and supporting overall economic growth. Funding is primarily managed with bilateral allocations through post-secondary institutions, research institutes, non-governmental organizations and the private sector, plus multilateral allocations through organizations like the numerous United Nations entities under the United Nations Sustainable Development Group.

== Creation ==
In May 2006, Mastercard Incorporated held its initial public offering (IPO) that valued it at about US$5.6 billion; as part of the IPO, Mastercard Inc. donated 13.5 million shares, expected to be worth an initial US$600 million (equivalent to US$958.2 million in 2025), to a newly created independent charitable foundation to be named the Mastercard Foundation.

As documents of creation dictate that the foundation's Mastercard shares are not to be sold for 21 years, Mastercard Incorporated committed to an additional $40 million in direct cash donations to the foundation over the first four years; the foundation's general charitable donations are funded from the dividends provided by the 13.5 million shares, which were not allowed to be used until 2008.

For the first two years of operation, while the dividends were accumulating, the foundation was run by a board appointed by Mastercard Inc., which was replaced by an independent board and leadership in 2008. In 2008, Reeta Roy was hired as the first independent president and CEO, working with the new independent board of directors to set the specific direction of The Mastercard Foundation.

== Mission ==
The Mastercard Foundation's mission is to advance education and financial inclusion in developing countries and to support Indigenous youth in Canada. It seeks a world where everyone has the opportunity to learn and prosper.

At the African Green Revolution Forum's presidential summit in 2019, Mastercard Foundation CEO Reeta Roy stated "Our goal is simple. It is to make the invisible visible. It’s to enable young people to create dignified work where it does not exist today".

== Major funding partnerships ==
In 2008, the foundation launched a partnership with BRAC to expand financial services to approximately two million people across Uganda.

In September 2012, the Mastercard Foundation Scholars Program was announced at a United Nations special session, committing US$500 million toward the education of 15,000 African scholars for secondary, undergraduate and masters levels. For example, the Duke University Scholars Program received a $13.5 million commitment from the foundation's Scholars Program, among a select group of institutions that has been participating in the program since 2012.

In 2013, the Mastercard Foundation hosted the first Symposium on Financial Inclusion (SoFI); SoFi was held annually through to 2017.

In 2015, the Mastercard Foundation Fund for Rural Prosperity (FRP) was launched. It is set up as a challenge fund, through which the FRP is able to find and support private sector businesses in Sub-Saharan Africa that can scale up innovative ideas that expand financial inclusion to smallholder farmers and rural areas.

In 2017, the Mastercard Foundation launched the EleV Program, which seeks to support Indigenous youth in Canada on their journeys through education and on to meaningful livelihoods. In 2019, it was expanded with a goal of supporting 30,000 Indigenous youth. The EleV Program engages in two kinds of partnerships: EleV Anchor Collaborative Partnerships focus on creating sustainable systems change led by Indigenous communities and youth in partnership with a diverse set of stakeholders including educators and employers; Catalytic and Learning Partnerships harness opportunities for learning and/or acceleration in economic sectors or program areas key to the EleV strategy. They enhance the work of our regional anchor partnerships and strengthen Indigenous and youth-led social infrastructure and organizations.

In March 2018, the Mastercard Foundation reset its overall strategy for 2018–2030, creating the Young Africa Works long-term plan. The Young Africa Works strategy aims to help up to 30 million young women and men in Africa to secure or create dignified and fulfilling work over the period 2018–2030, with a financial commitment of $500 million over the course of the strategy, of which $200 million in five-year commitments were revealed in announcements over the course of 2018 and 2019. The Young Africa Works initiative was first announced in March 2018, at an overall kickoff ceremony in Kigali, Rwanda. Further funding commitments, partners and programs have been announced, including: long-term commitments to create, expand or maintain "Young Africa Works in Senegal", announced in September 2019; long-term commitments to create, expand or maintain "Young Africa Works in Ethiopia", announced in October 2019; and announcements in Ghana, Nigeria and Uganda, amongst the 10 nations involved in the initial announcements. In all cases, the Young Africa Works programs will see bilateral agreements and funding with in-nation institutions, governments and organizations.

According to the OECD, the Mastercard Foundation provided $298.3 million for development in 2019, all in the form of grants delivered during that year.
