= Primary School Leaving Examination (Tanzania) =

School examination in Tanzania

The Primary School Leaving Examination (Tanzania) (PSLE) is a primary education examination that is done by Standard 7 students (7th grade) across Tanzania and serves as the secondary school entrance exam. The exams are usually administered between late June to early or mid-August and are managed by the National Examinations Council of Tanzania (NECTA). Students are required to obtain three credits to pass the exams. Critiques of the PSLE include the inability to reflect the abilities of students often found with examinations, with a particular twist given Tanzania's rising primary attendance and graduation rates:

"In its current form [PSLE] is an unsuitable vehicle for the examination of candidates who have been educated in a competency based curriculum. Very different forms of assessment are required to test skill and competence, as compared to the traditional testing of factual knowledge. This challenge is complicated by the fact that if retention is improved, quite soon a full range of pupil ability will be represented in the final year of primary school and will be need[ed] to have an examination which is capable of measuring the abilities of that full range. Such am [sic] assessment is much more complex and subtle than the traditional system."

Further, the PSLE is conducted in English, which provides significant institutional barriers to Limited English Proficiency (LEP) students in a country where between 120 and 164 languages are spoken, the lone national language is Kiswahili, and English integration in Tanzanian daily life has been far less successful than in other former British colonies in East Africa, like Kenya.
