= Ministry of Education and Vocational Training =

- Wizara ya Elimu na Mafunzo ya Ufundi (Swahili)

Ministry overview
- Formed: 2004
- Dissolved: 2015
- Superseding Ministry: Ministry of Education, Science, Technology and Vocational Training
- Jurisdiction: Government of Tanzania
- Headquarters: 7 Magogoni Street, Kivukoni, Dar es Salaam, Tanzania
- Website: The Ministry Website

The Ministry of Education and Vocational Training was a government body responsible for providing education in Tanzania. The head offices were located in Dar es Salaam. Under President John Magufuli's first cabinet, the ministry was amalgamated with other functions to form the new Ministry of Education, Science, Technology and Vocational Training.

== Organization of ministry ==
The permanent secretary, Sifuni Mchome, acts as the main custodian of the ministry's resources and is its chief accounting officer. The policy and planning division and the management information unit are under the secretary's direct supervision.

The commissioner of education, under the permanent secretary, is the chief academic advisor in all aspects of professional departments and parastatal organizations. The commissioner supervises the special needs education unit, the distance learning unit, the school registration unit, the primary education division, the secondary education division, the teacher education division, the technical and vocational education division, the higher education division, the adult and non formal education division, and the school inspectorate division.

The core functions of the ministry are coordinated through the following divisions and units:

- Primary education division, whose jurisdiction includes pre-primary education
- Secondary education division
- Teacher education division
- School inspectorate division
- Adult and non formal education division
- Technical and vocational education division
- Higher education division
- Special needs education unit
- Distance learning unit
- School registration unit
- Cross cutting issues unit

The support functions of the ministry are provided by the following divisions and units:

- Policy and planning division
- Administration and human resources management division
- Legal services unit
- Finance and accounts unit
- Internal audit unit
- Information, education and communication unit
- Procurement management unit
- Education management information system unit
- National Commissions for UNESCO

== Education agencies, authorities, boards, councils, commissions, and institutes ==
Other Tanzanian educational organizations exist, some of which are under the jurisdiction of the Ministry of Education and Vocational Training. They include:

- Tanzania Institute of Education
- Institute of Adult Education
- National Examinations Council of Tanzania
- Tanzania Library Services Board
- Agency for the Development of Educational Management
- Vocational Education and Training Authority
- National Council for Technical Education
- Higher Education Students' Loans Board
- Tanzania Education Authority
- Tanzania Commission for Universities

=== Tanzania Institute of Education ===
The Tanzania Institute of Education (TIE) is a parastatal organization under the Ministry of Education and Vocational Training. TIE is "charged with the responsibility of ensuring the quality of education in Tanzania at the pre-school, primary, secondary and teacher training levels." It was founded in 1963 under an act of parliament whereby TIE was under the University College of Dar es Salaam, then a constituent of the University of East Africa. In 1975, parliament legally disengaged TIE from the University of Dar es Salaam and made TIE a state corporation.

=== Institute of Adult Education ===
The Institute of Adult Education was established in 1975. The institute is responsible for running continuing and non-formal education programmes for adults, with special emphasis on rural communities.

=== National Examinations Council of Tanzania ===
The National Examinations Council of Tanzania was established in 1973. The council is responsible for administering all national examinations and awarding primary, secondary, and post-secondary official diplomas.

=== Tanzania Library Services Board ===
The Tanzania Library Services Board (TLSB) was established in 1963 but is now governed by a law passed in 1975. TLSB promotes, establishes, equips, and develops libraries, information centers, and documentation centers. TLSB provides information to all groups of people, including children, youth, adults, and disadvantaged groups. In carrying out these responsibilities, TLSB acquires, organizes, and distributes books, non-book materials, and other forms of information materials to individuals, schools, institutions, and the public.

=== Agency for the Development of Educational Management ===
The Agency for the Development of Educational Management was established under the Executive Agencies Act, 1997. Its purpose is to provide regular and systematized educational management and administration training for all categories of educational management and administration personnel in the education service.

=== Vocational Education and Training Authority ===
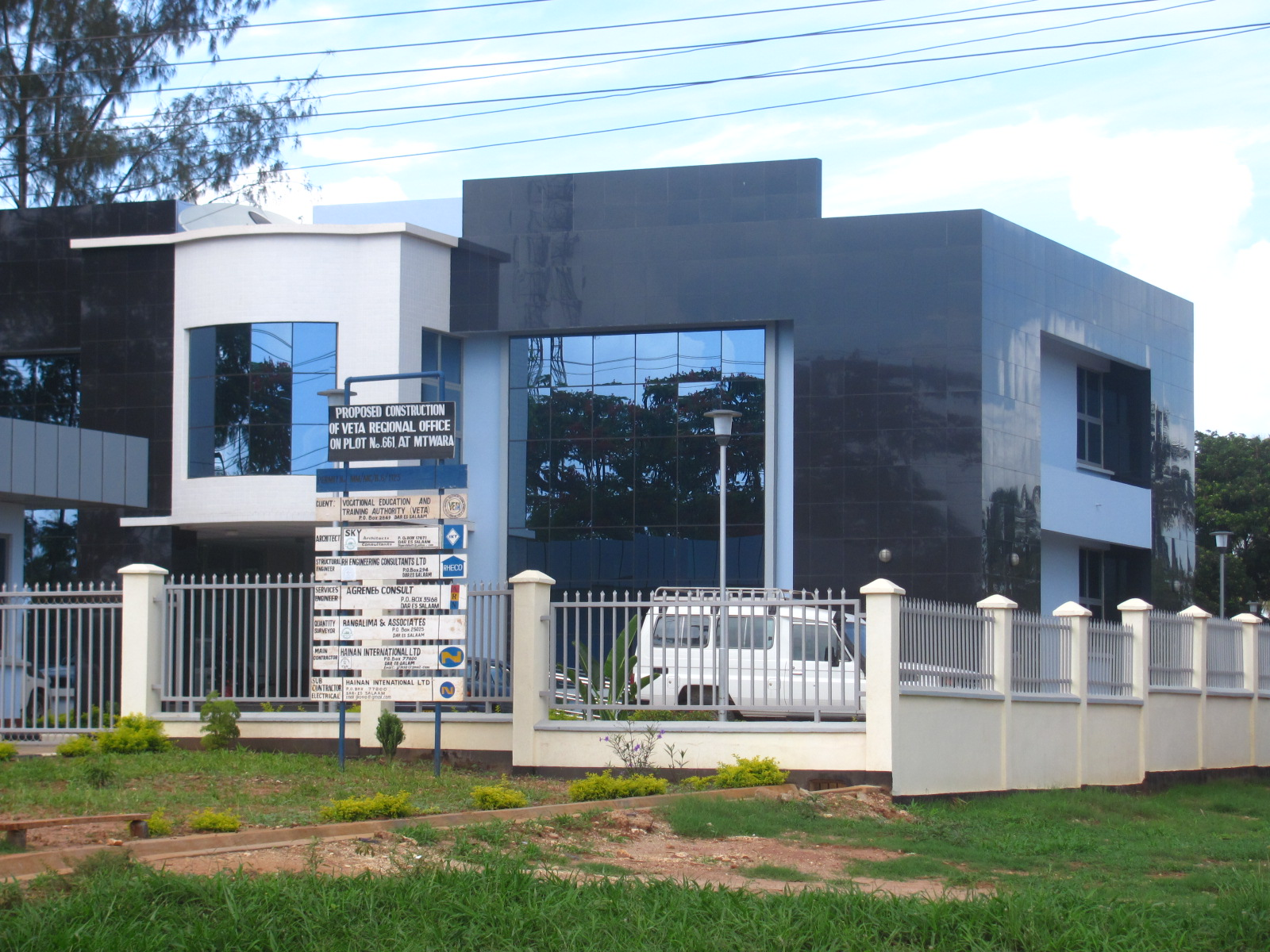
The Vocational Education and Training Authority of Tanzania office based in Mtwara.

The Vocational Education and Training Authority was established in 1994. It is an autonomous government agency charged with the overall responsibility for coordinating, regulating, financing, providing, and promoting vocational education and training.

=== National Council for Technical Education ===
The National Council for Technical Education was established in 1998. It is responsible for overseeing the provision of quality technical education and training in Tanzania.

=== Higher Education Students' Loans Board ===
The Higher Education Students' Loans Board (HESLB) was established in 2004. HESLB is responsible for issuing loans to students pursuing advanced/higher diplomas and degree studies at accredited higher education institutions in and outside the country. HESLB is also required to collect repayment for all loans issued to students since 1994, so as to make the scheme successful and sustainable.

=== Tanzania Education Authority ===
The Tanzania Education Authority is a corporate body established in 2001. Its purpose is to manage the Education Fund, which supports education projects submitted by universities, technical colleges, and full-registered schools.

=== Tanzania Commission for Universities ===
The Tanzania Commission for Universities (TCU) was established in 2005 as the successor to the Higher Education Accreditation Council. Prior to the establishment of TCU, each higher education institution implemented its mandatory functions as stipulated in its individual Act of Parliament or constitutions. In the same Act that established TCU, Parliament repealed all the prior Acts that dealt with institutions individually. Each institution was then required to register with TCU.

TCU is a body corporate mandated to recognize, approve, register, and accredit universities operating in Tanzania, and local or foreign university level programs being offered by non-TCU registered higher education institutions. TCU also coordinates the proper functioning of all university institutions in Tanzania to foster a harmonized higher education system in the country.

== See also ==
- Education in Tanzania
- Government of Tanzania
- University of Dar es Salaam
