= Certificate of Secondary Education Examination (Tanzania) =

School examination in Tanzania

The Certificate of Secondary Education Examination (CSEE) is an academic O Level examination that is done by form four students (Grade 10) across Tanzania to prepare them for their A level studies. The exams are usually done between late September to early or mid November and they are managed by the National Examinations Council of Tanzania (NECTA). Students are required to obtain three credits in order to pass the exams.
