= Arumeru District =

Former District in Arusha Region, Tanzania

Arumeru
- District
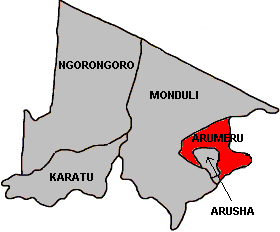
- Map of Arusha Region's districts with Arumeru highlighted
- Coordinates: 03°08′S 36°52′E
- Country: Tanzania
- Region: Arusha Region

Population (2002)
  - Total: 516,814

Arumeru District (Meru District and Arusha Rural District) is a former district in the Arusha Region of Tanzania. It was bordered to the north, west, and southwest by Monduli District, to the southeast by the city of Arusha, and to the east by the Kilimanjaro Region.

As of 2002, the population of the Arumeru District was 516,814.

== Administrative subdivisions ==
=== Constituencies ===
For parliamentary elections, Arusha Region is divided into constituencies. As of the 2010 elections Arumeru District had two constituencies, Arumeru West (Arumeru Magharibi) Constituency and Arumeru East (Arumeru Mashariki) Constituency.

=== Divisions ===
Beginning in 2007 Arumeru District has been administered by two district councils: Arusha District Council and Meru District Council. Arusha District Council administers three divisions, 20 wards, 75 villages, 294 hamlets and 64,339 households. Meru District Council administers three divisions, 17 wards, 71 villages and 281 subvillages.

=== Wards ===
The Arumeru District is administratively divided into 37 wards:

- Akheri
- Bangata
- Bwawani
- Ilkiding'a
- Kikatiti
- Kikwe
- Kimnyaki
- King'ori
- Kiranyi
- Kisongo
- Leguruki
- Makiba
- Lemanyata
- Maji ya Chai
- Maroroni
- Mateves
- Mbuguni
- Mlangarini
- Moivo
- Moshono
- Murieti
- Musa
- Mwandeti
- Nduruma
- Ngarenanyuki
- Nkoanrua
- Nkoaranga
- Nkoarisambu
- Oldonyosambu
- Oljoro
- Olkokola
- Oltroto
- Oltrumet
- Poli
- Singisi
- Sokoni II
- Songoro
- Usa River

== Economy ==
The district economy is almost entirely agricultural, consisting mostly of subsistence farming and livestock raising. Exports from the few large-scale commercial horticultural farms bring in most of the money in the district. In 2012, that economy in Arumeru District was threatened when, local landless residents forcibly occupied some of those commercial farms.
