= Usa River, Meru District, Arusha =

Ward of Meru District, Arusha Region

Usa River Kata ya Usa River (Swahili)
- Ward of Meru District
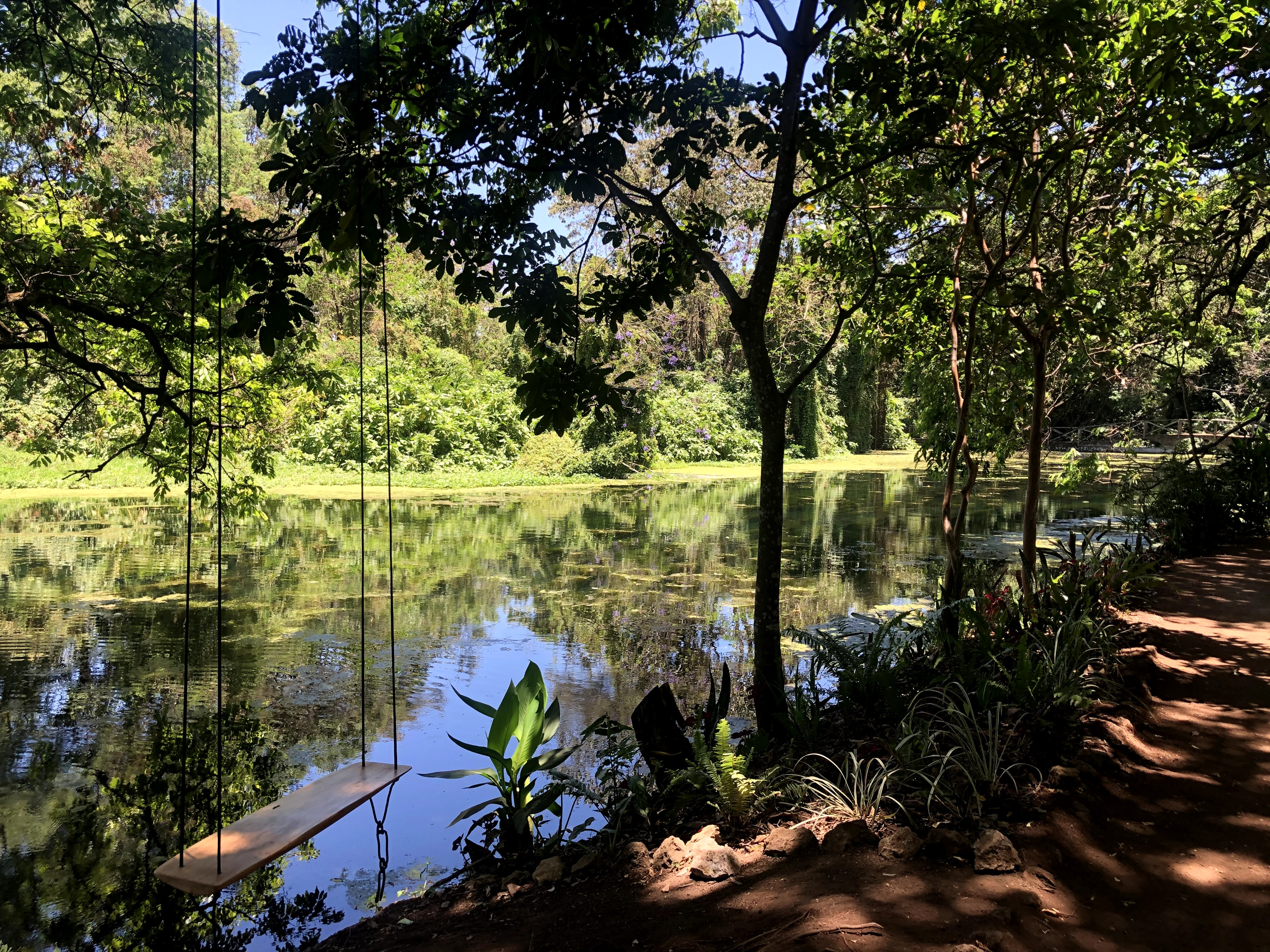
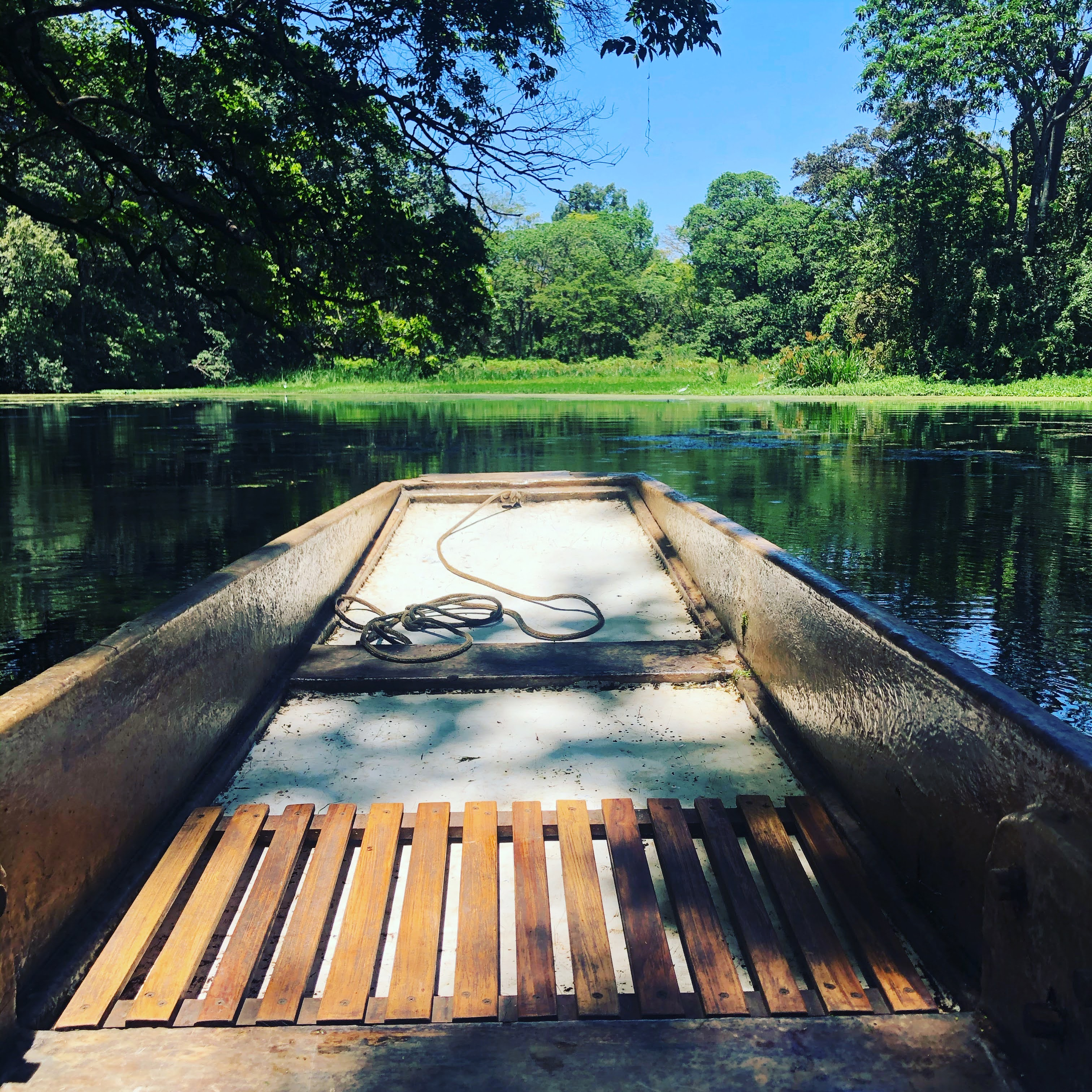
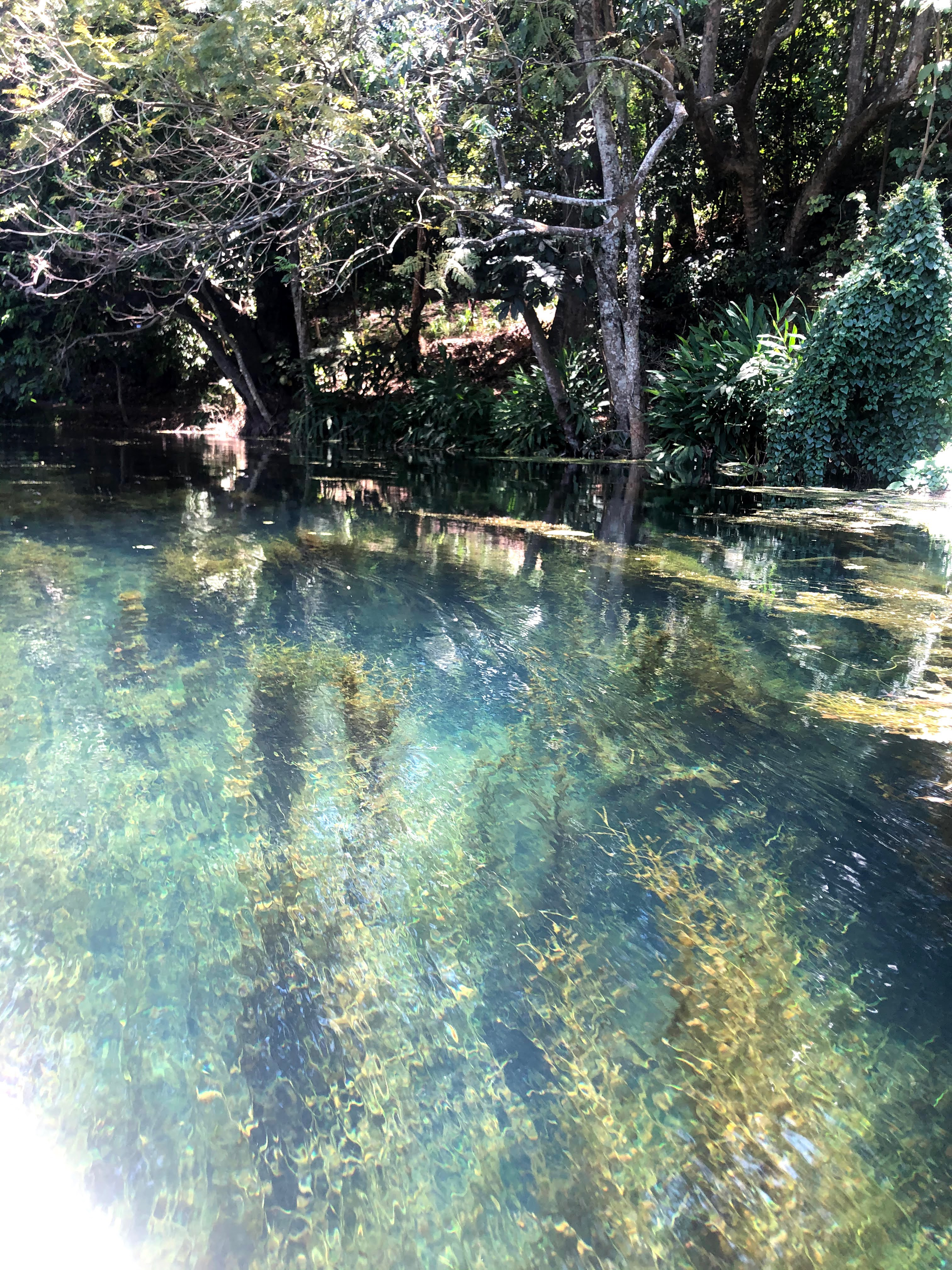
- From top to bottom: Scene in Ngaresero neighborhood of Usa River ward, Meru District, boat on Ngaresero & Clear water of the Ngaresero
- Nickname: Meru's capital
- Interactive map of Usa River
- Coordinates: 3°22′16.68″S 36°51′29.88″E
- Country: Tanzania
- Region: Arusha Region
- District: Meru District

Area
  - Total: 27.6 km^{2} (10.7 sq mi)

Population (2012)
  - Total: 23,437
- Demonym: Usa Rivan

Ethnic groups
  - Settler: Swahili, Chagga & Arusha
  - Ancestral: Rwa
- Tanzanian Postal Code: 23301

Usa River also known locally as Ussa (Kata ya Usa River in Swahili) is an administrative ward of the Meru District in the Arusha Region of Tanzania. It is the seat of Meru District. To the north and west, the ward is surrounded by the wards of Nkoaranga, Poli, and Seela Sing'isi. To the south and east, respectively, are the wards of Kikwe and Maroroni, and Maji ya Chai. As of 2012, Usa River ward had a population of 23,437.

== Administration ==
The postal code for Usa River Ward is 23301. The ward is divided into the following neighborhoods (Mitaa):

- Kwa Kisambare
- Magadini
- Magadirisho
- Manyata Kati

- Mji Mwema
- Mlima Siyoni
- Nganana
- Ngaresero
- Usa Madukani

=== Government ===
Like every other ward in the country, the ward has local government offices based on the population served. The Usa River Ward administration building houses a court as per the Ward Tribunal Act of 1988, including other vital departments for the administration of the ward. The ward has the following administration offices:

- Usa River Ward Police Station
- Usa River Ward Government Office (Afisa Mtendaji, Kata ya Ndugumbi)
- Usa River Ward Tribunal (Baraza La Kata) is a Department inside Ward Government Office

In the local government system of Tanzania, the ward is the smallest democratic unit. Each ward comprises a committee of eight elected council members, including a chairperson, one salaried officer (with no voting rights), and an executive officer. One-third of seats are reserved for women councilors.

== Economy ==
The ward houses the district headquarters and serves as the tourism center for Meru District. Kennedy House School, Kili Flora Farms, and River Trees Country Inn are all in the ward.

== Demographics ==
The ward serves as the Rwa people's ancestral home, along with much of the district. As the city developed over time, the ward became a cosmopolitan ward.

== Health and education ==
=== Education ===
The ward is home to these educational institutions:

- New Hope Primary School
- Kilimani Primary School
- Leganga Primary School
- Mariando Primary School
- Mariando Secondary School
- The Voice Secoundary School
- Bethlehem Star Primary school
- Muungano-usa River Secondary School
- Nkoanekoli Secondary School
- Usa River RC Seminary
- The MS Training Centre for Development Cooperation
- School of St Jude, Usa River Campus
- The Usa River Rehabilitation Center
- Kennedy House International School

=== Healthcare ===
- Mjimwema Health Center
- Usa River Roman Catholic Health Center
