= Maji ya Chai =

Ward in Meru District, Arusha Region

Maji ya Chai Ward Kata ya Maji ya Chai (Swahili)
- Ward
- Kata ya Maji ya Chai
- Location within Tanzania
- Country: Tanzania
- Region: Arusha Region
- District: Meru District

Population (2012)
  - Total: 29,313

Maji ya Chai is an administrative ward in the Meru District of the Arusha Region of Tanzania. The ward is home to the University of Arusha is also where the gate of Arusha National Park is located. According to the 2012 census, the ward has a total population of 29,313. Thus making the ward the most populous in Meru district.

== Etymology ==
The name of the ward in Swahili means 'tea water' based on the river that flows through the village is a red brown color which resembles brewed tea. This comes from the geological conditions of Mt. Meru.
