= Musa (Tanzanian ward) =

Musa is an administrative ward in the Arumeru district of the Arusha Region of Tanzania. The district and ward were dissolved in 2007 becoming parts of the Arusha and Meru districts.

According to the 2002 census, the ward has a total population of 10,763.
