= Momela Lakes =

Shallow lakes within Arusha National Park

Big Momela
- Momela Kubwa (Swahili)
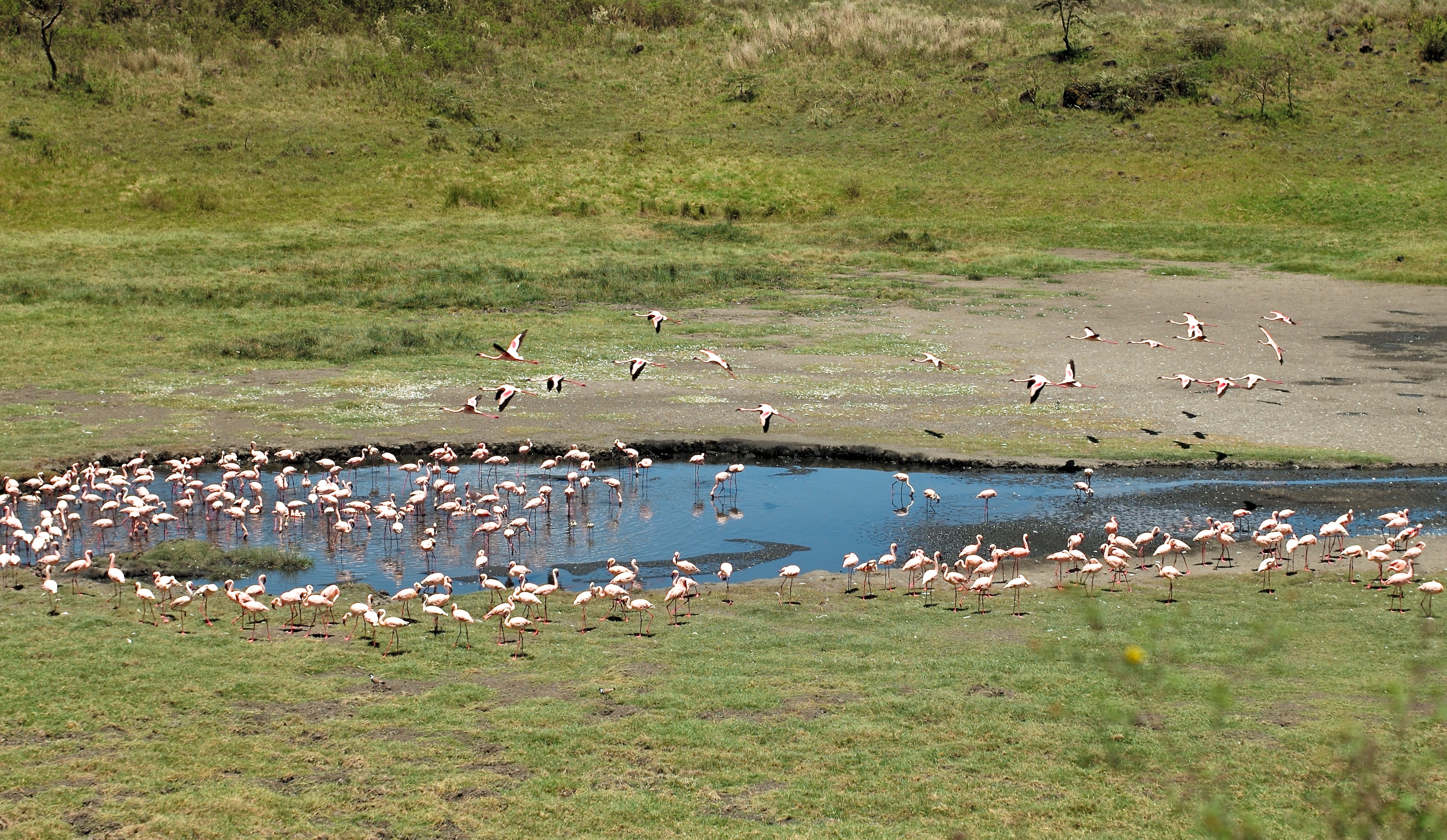
- Flamingos at Momela Lake

- Location within Tanzania Location within Africa
- Location: Arusha National Park, Tanzania
- Group: Momella Lakes
- Coordinates: 3°13′20″S 36°54′36″E
- Type: alkaline lake

Small Momela
- Momela Ndogo (Swahili)
- Location within Tanzania
- Location: Arusha National Park, Tanzania
- Group: Momella Lakes
- Coordinates: 3°13′38″S 36°53′45″E
- Type: alkaline lake

El Kekhotoito
- Location within Tanzania
- Location: Arusha National Park, Tanzania
- Group: Momella Lakes
- Coordinates: 3°14′2″S 36°52′40.9″E
- Type: alkaline lake

Kusare
- Location within Tanzania
- Location: Arusha National Park, Tanzania
- Group: Momella Lakes
- Coordinates: 3°13′35″S 36°52′50″E
- Type: alkaline lake

Rishateni
- Location within Tanzania
- Location: Arusha National Park, Tanzania
- Group: Momella Lakes
- Coordinates: 3°13′39.5″S 36°53′45.7″E
- Type: alkaline lake

Lekandiro
- Location within Tanzania
- Location: Arusha National Park, Tanzania
- Group: Momella Lakes
- Coordinates: 3°12′39″S 36°53′42″E
- Type: alkaline lake

Tulusia
- Location within Tanzania
- Location: Arusha National Park, Tanzania
- Group: Momella Lakes
- Coordinates: 3°12′40″S 36°54′25″E
- Type: alkaline lake

The Momela (or Momella) Lakes are seven shallow lakes located within Arusha National Park namely: Big Momela, Small Momela, El Kekhotoito, Kusare, Rishateni, Lekandiro and Tulusia. Entrance to the park is in Village Momella, Meru District of Arusha Region, Tanzania

== Geography ==
Lakes are alkaline formed from the volcanic debris created when Mount Meru blew its top 250,000 years ago. As the lakes are alkaline, animals do not drink from their waters, but you can spot zebras and birds on their banks. Lakes are the highlights of the Eastern section of Arusha National Park, covering the forest of Mount Meru.

== See also ==
- Wildlife of Tanzania
