= Meru District =

District of Arusha Region, Tanzania

Meru District Wilaya ya Meru (Swahili)
- District of Arusha
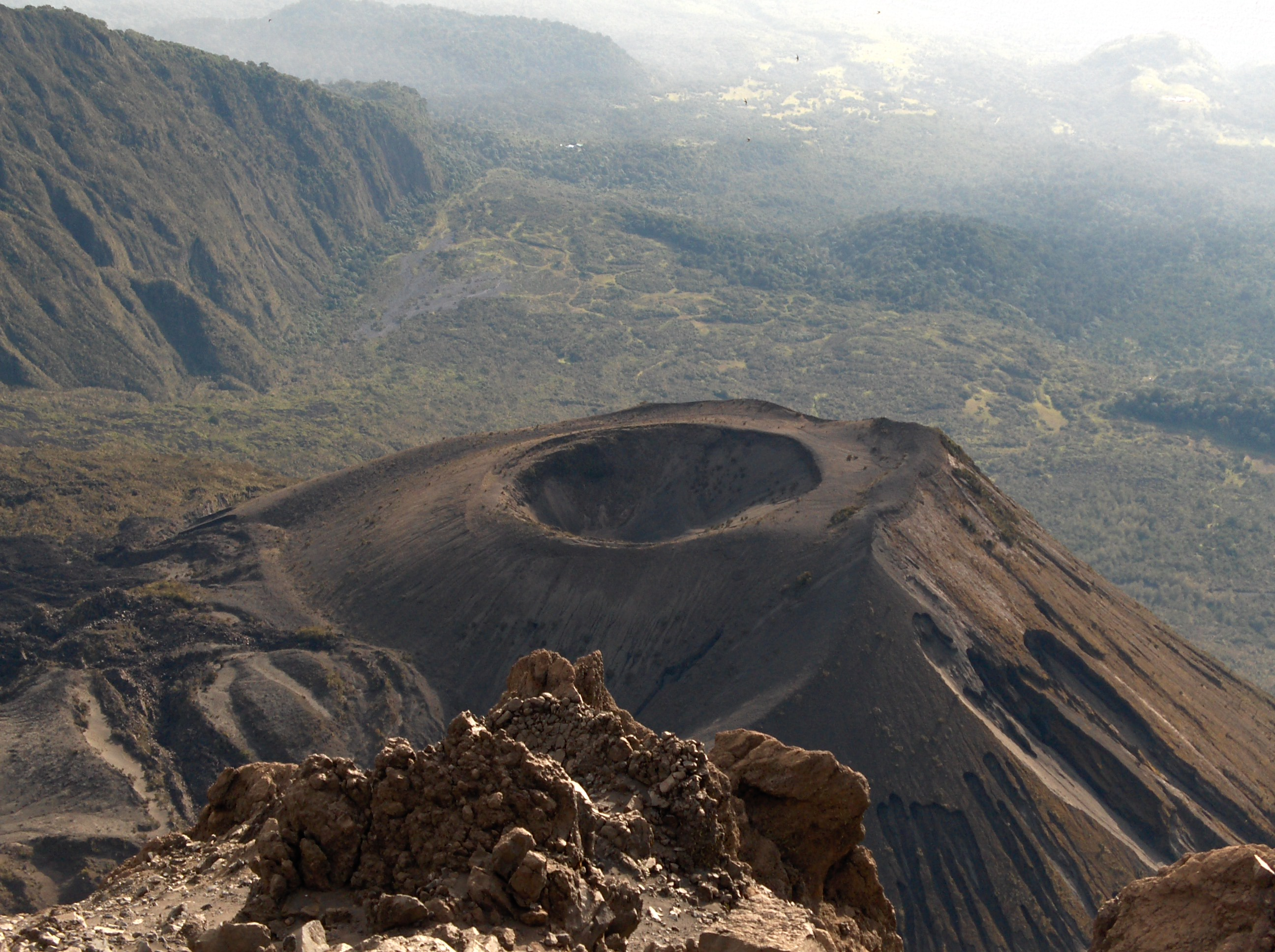
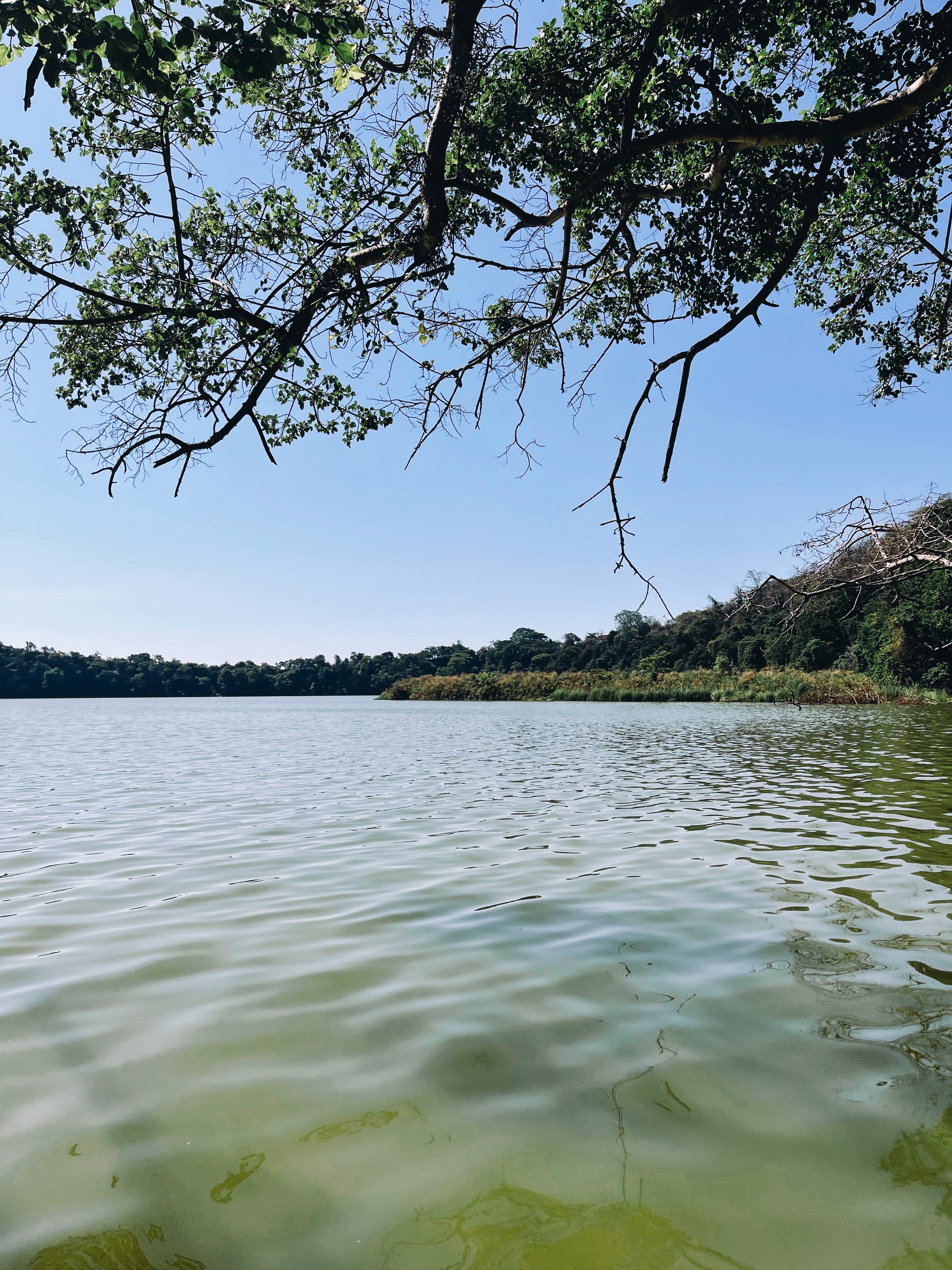
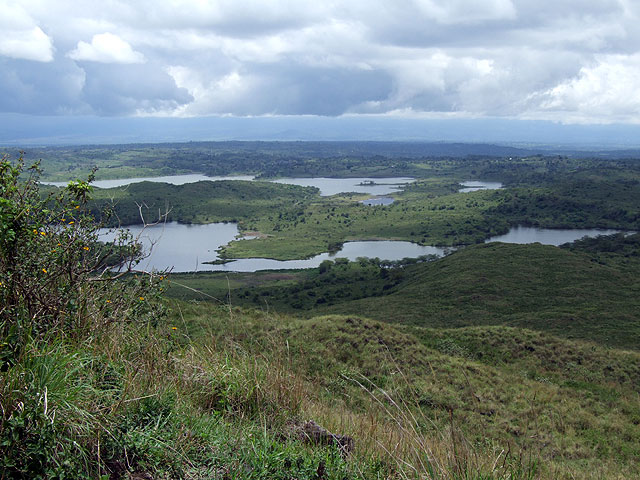
- From top to bottom: Mount Meru Ashcone, Lake Duluti and the Momella lakes
- Nickname: The lakes district
- Meru District in Arusha
- Coordinates: 03°22′17.4″S 36°53′47.76″E
- Country: Tanzania
- Region: Arusha Region
- District: 1 July 2007
- Named for: Rwa people
- Capital: Usa River

Area
  - Total: 1,266 km^{2} (489 sq mi)
  - Rank: 5th in Arusha
- Elevation: 1,387 m (4,551 ft)
- Highest elevation (Rhino Point on Mount Meru): 3,800 m (12,500 ft)

Population (2022 census)
  - Total: 331,603
  - Rank: 3rd in Arusha
  - Density: 261.9/km^{2} (678.4/sq mi)
- Demonym: Meruan

Ethnic groups
  - Settler: Swahili, Chaga & Pare,
  - Native: Rwa
- Time zone: UTC+3 (EAT)
- Tanzanian Postcode: 233xx
- Website: Official website
- Symbols of Tanzania
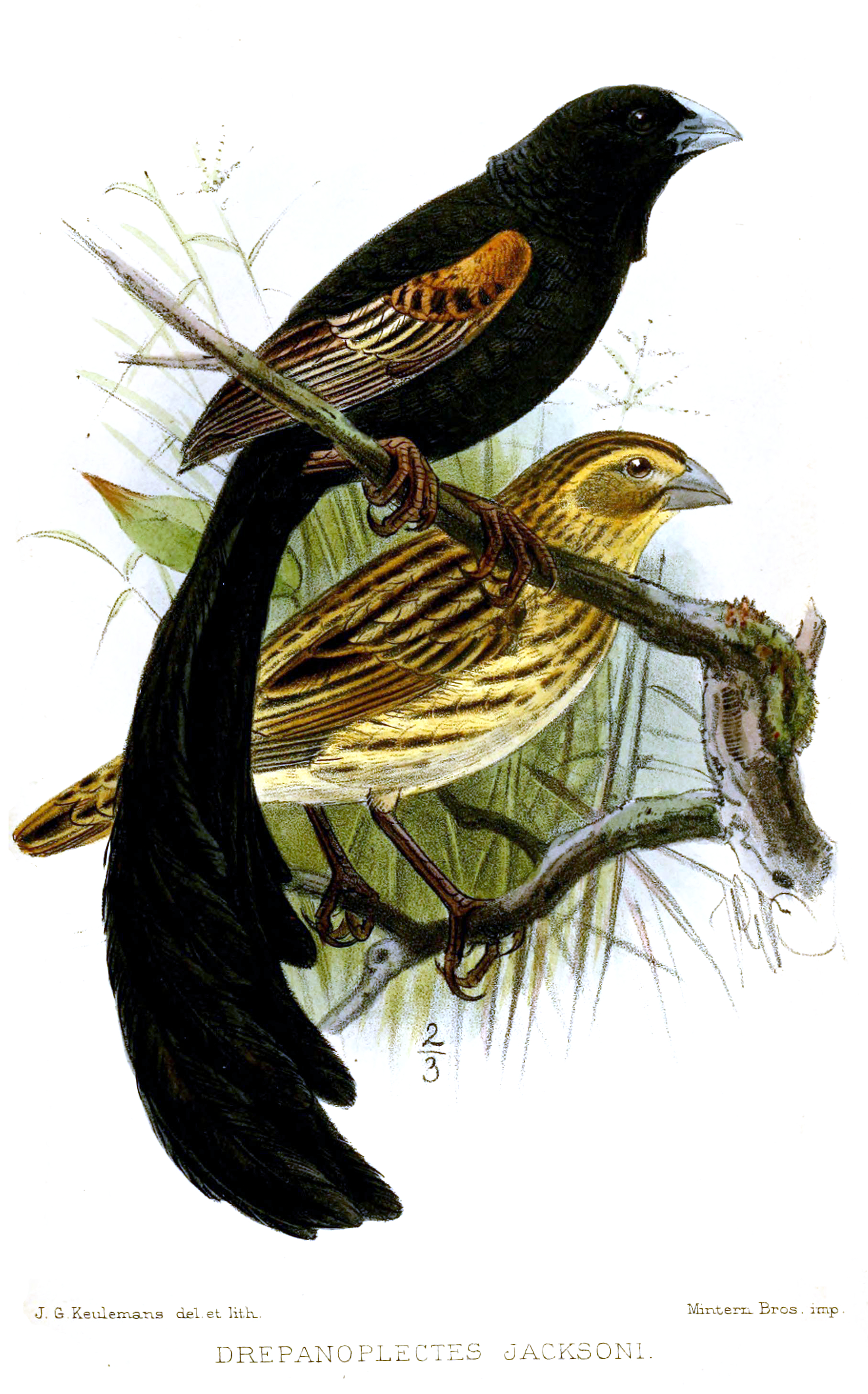
- Bird: Jackson's widowbird

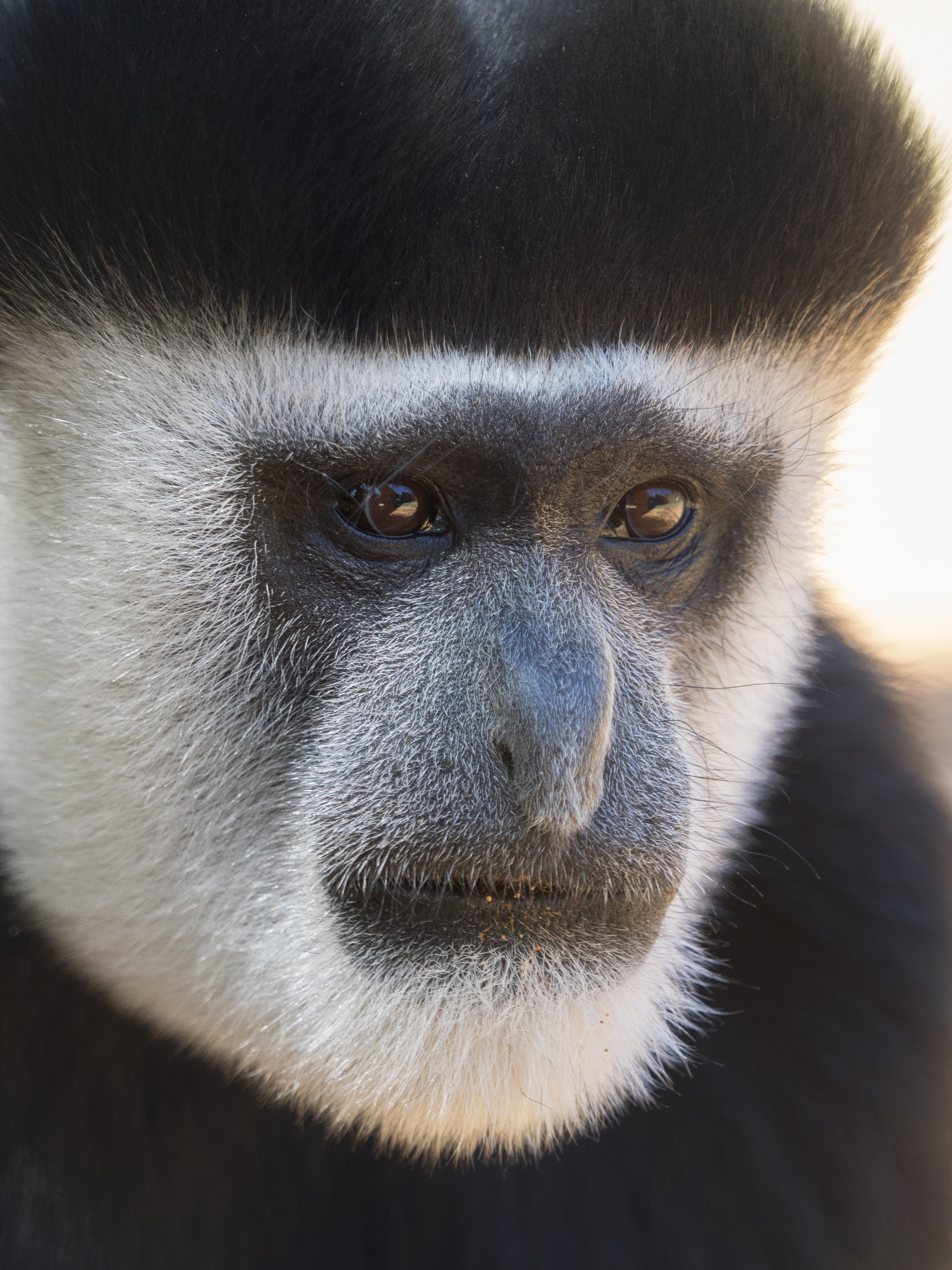
- Mammal: Guereza colobus

Meru District, officially the Meru District Council (Wilaya ya Meru, in Swahili), is one of seven districts of the Arusha Region of Tanzania.The District is bordered to the north by Longido District, to the east by Siha and Hai Districts of Kilimanjaro Region, to the south by Simanjiro District of Manyara Region, and to the west by Arusha Rural District and Arusha Urban District. It covers an area of 1,266 km^{2} (489 sq mi). The district is comparable in size to the land area of Faroe Islands. Meru District has an max elevation of 3,800 m (12,500 ft) at Rhino Point on Mount Meru. The administrative capital of the district is Usa River. According to the 2022 Tanzania National Census, the population of Meru District council was 331,603.

== Etymology ==
The district is named after Mount Meru, which is named after the Rwa people.

== History ==
=== First communities ===
The first communities in what would be the Meru District were the now extinct Koningo people, a hunter gatherer group that lived around the slopes of Mount Meru for centuries. The second community to settle in the area is the Meru People, who immigrated there from the Usambara Mountains in Tanga Region, they are the majority of residents in the district. They settled on the southeastern slopes of the mountain and started to farm the land.

== Geography ==
Meru District has a total size of 1,268.2 square kilometers, with forest reserves covering around 13% (163.7 km^{2}). An area of approximately 813.5 km^{2} (64.1%) is used for agricultural activities, 37.05 km^{2} (3%) for grazing, 15 km^{2} (0.001%) for pasture/fodder, 203.7 km^{2} (16%) is in Arusha National Park, 5.7 km^{2} (0.4%) is water bodies, and the remaining area of 44.39 km^{2} (3.6%) is settlement and unspecified land.

=== Climate ===
The major climate in Meru District is tropical savanna, with distinct rainy and dry seasons. The average annual rainfall is 500 mm to 1200 mm, and it usually rains between mid-October and December, February, and May. The distribution of these rains is completely improper for agricultural and livestock rearing activities in the District. Meru district's soil is relatively fertile due to its volcanic origins. They are well-drained dark sandy loams with good moisture retention. However, soil erosion occurs in agro-pastoral areas, particularly in King'ori Ward of eastern Meru District.

The district has bimodal rainfall, with short rains (Vuli) falling from November to January and long rains (Masika) falling from March to June, resulting in two agricultural seasons with annual rainfall ranging between 500 and 1200 mm and average temperatures of about 25 °C (January–February) and 22 °C (March–August). The district features 11 perennial rivers and 143 springs, some of which serve as irrigation, residential, and cattle water sources.

== Economy ==
=== Infrastructure ===
Meru district is home to Kilimanjaro International Airport (JRO) which is also shared by Hai District in Kilimanjaro Region. As for water infrastructure, the water need in Meru district as of 2017 is 18,381.12 m^{3}/day. The water supply was 11,580 m^{3}/day, approximately 64.5% of the total requirement. The percentage of persons that have access to clean and safe water is 64.5%. The percentage of persons that get water within 400 meters is 41%. Deep and shallow wells are the district's primary source of drinking water. However, the situation is significantly better in urban areas, where 67% of all homes have piped water. All of these water sources are held by the village government, community water groups, or individuals. The paved trunk road T2 from Arusha to Moshi passes through the district. There is 146 kilometers of road in Meru District. Only 67.2 km are passable all year, with 32.8 km only usable during the dry seasons.

Electricity, the district is linked to the national grid, and commerce centers such as Usa River, Arusha, and Moshi are linked. The primary source of energy for cooking is wood, which accounts for 90% of the total, with gas stoves accounting for the remaining 0.5%.The most common source of lightning is kerosene, which is used by 90% of all private households, followed by electricity (biogas, fuel wood,) at 5%. Trade centers such as Usa River fuel wood, including charcoal, is the primary source of energy for cooking in 90% of households, followed by kerosene at 5%.

=== Agriculture ===
Agriculture is the most important economic activity in Meru District. Coffee, bananas, maize, and sunflowers are among the crops farmed. Cattle, goats, and poultry are examples of livestock. The district is also one of Tanzania's horticultural capitals. Hortanzania Ltd in Maji ya Chai, Kiliflora Ltd in Usa River, Tengeru Flowers in Maji ya Chai, Tanzania Flowers in Maji ya Chai, Kilimanjaro Dekker Bruins and Mount Meru Flowers both in Akheri Ward are flower companies situated in Meru District.

=== Industry and Trade ===
The majority of the Meru district is occupied by small and medium-sized businesses. In 2017, the district had 2,200 stores, 296 barbershops, 23 hotels, 95 guesthouses, and 264 bars. To name a few, important industries situated there include Jumbo Textile Ltd, Tanzania Poultry Farm Ltd, Hughes Motors Ltd, and Maji Tech.

=== Tourism ===
Meru District is home to tourist attractions such as the Arusha National Park, the Momella Lakes, Lake Duluti, Kalanga Forest Reserve in Nkoanenkoli, NAIC Forest Reserve in Nshapu, Sakila Hill in Sakila, Shumbumbu Hills Caves in Akheri Ward, Mringaringa in Poli Ward, and Usa River Springs Forest Reserve. Ulon'ga Falls are the District's tallest waterfall.

== Demographics ==
Meru District Council has a total population of 268,144 persons according to the Population and Housing Census of 2012. There are 131,264 men (49%) and 136,880 women (51%) among them. Meru District Council is predicted to have a population of 306,352 in 2017, with 149,968 (49%) males and 156,384 (51%) females. The average household size is projected to be 5 people. According to the Population of 2012, Meru District Council has an annual population growth rate of 2.7%.

== Administrative subdivisions ==
According to the legislation, Meru District Council has a standard administrative structure that extends to all levels, namely the council, the Ward, the Village, and the Sub Village. The district is divided into three divisions, twenty-six wards, 90 villages, and 337 sub-villages.

=== Wards ===
As of 2012, Meru District was administratively divided into 17 wards:

- Akheri
- Kikatiti
- Kikwe
- King'ori
- Leguruki
- Maji ya Chai
- Makiba
- Maroroni

- Mbuguni
- Ngarenanyuki
- Nkoanrua
- Nkoaranga
- Nkoarisambu
- Poli
- Seela Sing'isi
- Songoro, Meru
- Usa River

The 9 added wards as of 2017:

- Malula
- Uwiro
- Maruvango
- Imbaseni
- Nkoanokeli
- Ambureni
- Shambarai Burka
- Ngabobo
- Majengo

== Health and Education ==
=== Education ===
In 2007, there were only 38 secondary schools in the district, 21 of which were government-owned and 17 of which were private. In 2017, the district had 113 public elementary schools and 48 private primary schools. There were 29 state secondary schools and 28 private secondary schools in the same year. Meru District Council is home to five higher learning institutions: Makumira University College, Patadi Teacher's College, The University of Arusha, The Institute of Community Development, Tengeru, National Artificial Insemination Centre (NAIC) and Nelson Mandela University, and The Institute of Livestock Development, Tengeru.

=== Health ===
The council has two hospitals. 1 government hospital and 1 faith-based hospital that operates under a Public-Private Partnership. Council has 8 health centers, 6 of which are government, 2 of which are faith-based, and 50 dispensaries, 29 of which are government, 12 of which are faith-based, and 9 of which are private. There are three dispensaries operating under temporary structures (shistoni, Kitefu and Kisimiri chini).

==== Epidimiology and mortality ====
Meru District's Maternal death rate of 26/100,000; neonatal mortality rate of 6/1000. In general, females are more afflicted than men over the age of five, whereas males under the age of five are more affected than females. This is also reflected in total admissions, where females outnumber males. Clinical AIDS is the primary cause of death in younger children, while Pneumonia is the top cause of death in adults, with a case fatality rate (CFR) of 27. Rabies is the main cause of morbidity and mortality among notifiable diseases, with a CFR of 100%, followed by Malaria in terms of morbidity, with a CFR of 0.23. By June 2017, the prevalence of severe malaria had dropped from 10.91% to 5% and the HIV prevalence had dropped from 1.6% to 1.5%.

== Notable persons from Meru District ==
- Peter K. Palangyo, novelist and diplomat
- Mrisho Sarakikya, the first Chief of the Tanzanian Defence Force.
