= Impala Hotel Group =

Tanzanian hotel chain

- Industry: Hotel
- Founded: 1988
- Founder: A. M. Mrema
- Headquarters: West, Arusha
- Number of employees: 400
- Website: www.impalahotel.com

The Impala Hotel Group was a hotel chain in northern Tanzania. The group's parent company was Kijenge Estates, which was founded in 1988 by A.M. Mrema. At its peak the group operated hotels in three locations - the Impala Hotel in the centre of Arusha (opened 1998), the Ngurdoto Mount Lodge at Momella (opened in 2003) and the Naura Springs Hotel in the Sanawari neighbourhood of Arusha (opened in 2008).

The group's flagship property, the Impala Hotel, was once the most popular hotel in Arusha City, but closed in 2019 following Mrema's death in August 2017.

By 2021 the hotel group had accumulated substantial debts, and in February and September 2021, the Labour Court ordered various assets to be sold to pay salary arrears to 238 former employees of the group.

The Impala Hotel was reportedly sold to Ahmed Shabiby, the operator of Shabiby buses, who refurbished it and was due to reopen it in 2025.
