= Akheri =

Ward in Meru District, Arusha Region

Akheri Kata ya Akheri (Swahili)
- Ward
- Nickname: Land of lake Duluti
- Location within Tanzania
- Country: Tanzania
- Region: Arusha Region
- District: Meru District

Population
  - Total: 13,699

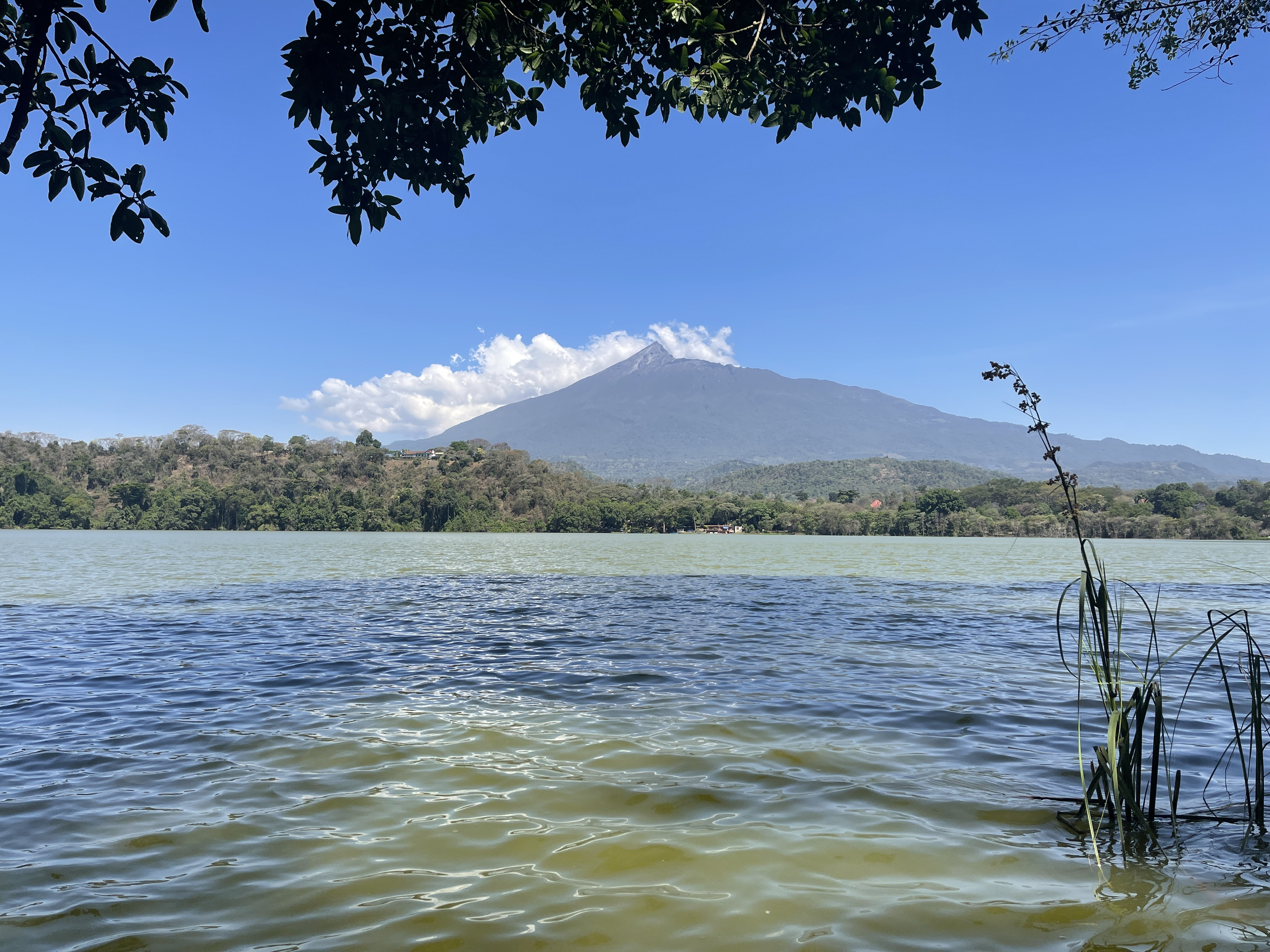
Lake Duluti with Meru in background, Akheri ward

Akheri is an administrative ward in the Meru District of the Arusha Region of Tanzania with an area of 16.65 km². Akheri ward is home to Lake Duluti. The largest settlement in the ward is the town of Tengeru. The ward is also home to Polish refugees WWII Cemetery. According to the 2002 census, the ward has a total population of 12,243.
