= Kenyon Painter =

Kenyon Vickers Painter
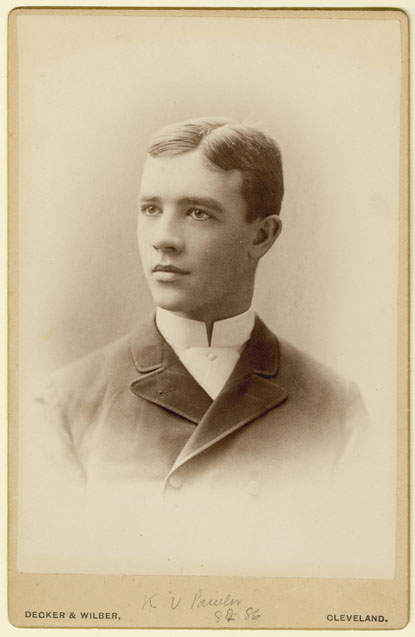
- Kenyon V. Painter at eighteen
- Born: 1867; West Chester, Pennsylvania, US
- Died: 1940 (aged 72–73); Cleveland Heights, Ohio, US
- Resting place: Lake View Cemetery, Cleveland
- Education: Yale
- Occupations: big game hunter, banker
- Spouse(s): Mary Chisholm; Leila Maud Wyeth

Kenyon Vickers Painter (January 14, 1867 – March 20, 1940) was an American banker, noted big game hunter, art collector and philanthropist. In later life, he was convicted of misapplication of funds from his bank, and sentenced to prison.

Painter, as the head of the largest bank in Cleveland, Ohio, was extremely generous. He supported the Cleveland Museum of Art, as well as being a major sponsor of churches, and was one of the founders, along with his wife Mary Chisholm Painter, of Western Reserve University, now known as Case Western Reserve University, one of the first universities in the county dedicated to the education of women. He was well known not only for his generosity, but also for his sporting lifestyle. He went on a number of safaris in Africa including one with President Teddy Roosevelt. He was also involved in early car races and was a cricket player in the athletic club in Cleveland.

== Personal life ==
Painter was born on 14 January 1867 in West Chester, Pennsylvania to wealthy parents, both of whom were Quakers. His mother, Lydia Ethel Farmer Painter, was a writer and an explorer whose exploits she detailed in her book Under Egypt's Skies. She also inherited the Farmer fortune which included the Cleveland and Pittsburgh Railroad. His father was John Vickers Painter, who distinguished himself managing the Cleveland office of the Cleveland and Toledo Railroad Company, and subsequently became a private banker.

Painter attended St. Paul's School in New Hampshire from 1881 to 1886, and then went to Yale University where he graduated in 1889. He married Mary Chisholm in 1893, who died in 1901.

In 1904, after the death of his father, Painter built an eighty-room mansion in Cleveland on twenty-eight acres of land. Painter kept a small zoo and a deer park on the grounds. In 1909 he married Leila Maud Wyeth and they had three children who survived to adulthood.

He died of a heart attack on 20 March 1940, in Cleveland Heights. His mansion was purchased by the Ursuline Sisters and in 1942 the property became the Beaumont School.

== Banking ==
Under his leadership, the Union Trust Company of Cleveland built what was the second largest building at the time, now known as The 925 Building in Cleveland. Additionally, Painter, made major investments in East Africa experimenting with the introduction of coffee and tea plantations in order to provide opportunities and economic growth for the area. During the depression, Painter lost the majority of his wealth, however, his bank continued to operate profitably.

In 1933, during a bank holiday regulatory bank officials ordered the bank closed. This decision was widely considered to be politically motivated due to Kenyon's affiliation with Teddy Roosevelt, and the Republican Party. Supporting this is the fact that although the bank did not reopen, it was solvent and all depositors, investors and creditors were fully paid. However. Painter in an effort to boost the stock value of the Union Trust had taken out a three million dollar loan with which he purchased stock in Union Trust. After the bank was ordered shut down, he was unable to repay the loan and was convicted of misfeasance and spent four months in prison before he was pardoned due to the circumstances by the governor, Martin L. Davey, in October 1937 due to Painter's declining health.

== African businesses ==
Painter had hunted in German East Africa as early as 1907, and when the area became Tanganyika, he invested heavily in the region, buying 11,000 acres of land outside Arusha which he turned into a coffee plantation. He also built a post office, church, hospital, and a hotel in Arusha, and established a coffee research center in nearby Tengeru. His total investments in northern Tanganyika topped US$11,000,000.
