= Leguruki =

Ward in Meru District, Arusha Region

- Ward
- Kata ya Leguruki
- Location within Tanzania
- Country: Tanzania
- Region: Arusha Region
- District: Meru District

Population
  - Total: 17,636

Leguruki is an administrative ward in the Meru District of the Arusha Region of Tanzania. The ward is home to ober 60 small lakes and is the lake ward of Meru district and also home to the eastern section of Arusha National Park. The ward is bordered to the east by Siha District of Kilimanjaro Region. According to the 2002 census, the ward has a total population of 15,678.
