= Oldonyosambu =

Ward in Arusha Rural District, Tanzania

- Ward
- Kata ya Oldonyosambu
- Location within Tanzania
- Coordinates: 03°07′01″S 36°44′12″E
- Country: Tanzania
- Region: Arusha Region
- District: Arusha Rural District

Population (2012)
  - Total: 16,484

Oldonyosambu is an administrative ward in the Arumeru district of the Arusha Region of Tanzania. The name is derived from the Maasai word Oldonyosambok meaning 'thick mountain'. According to the 2012 census, the ward has a total population of 16,484.
