= Kennedy House International School =

Coordinates: 3.38239°S 36.85821°E

Location
- Nelson Mandela Road, PO BOX 350; Usa River, Arusha; Tanzania

Information
- School type: Private
- Founded: 2009
- Founder: Frances Charters
- Faculty: 24
- Grades: Kindergarten – Year 8
- Gender: Co-educational
- Age: 2 to 13
- Enrolment: 90 (2015)
- International students: 45% (20 nationalities)
- Student to teacher ratio: 1:12
- Education system: National Curriculum
- Language: English
- Campuses: Usa River

Kennedy House International School is a private, International Primary School founded in 2009. It's 20 acre rural campus is situated in Usa River, on the outskirts of Arusha, in Tanzania. It was established out of the need for a quality international pre and primary school in the Usa River area. Kennedy House School is accredited by the Cambridge International Curriculum and follows the National Curriculum for England. The school's teaching staff are University Qualified International Teachers. Typically, pupils progress from Kennedy House to senior schools in Tanzania, the UK, mainland Europe, South Africa and Australia.

== Facilities ==
The school has dedicated Science, Music and Art rooms, playing fields for football, rugby, cricket and athletics, in addition to netball and tennis courts and a 25-metre swimming pool in which Kennedy House School hosts competitive swimming galas against other International Schools in Northern Tanzania.

== Location ==
The school is located in Usa River, between the cities of Arusha and Moshi, in Northern Tanzania. It is situated 24 kilometers from Kilimanjaro International Airport. It runs a daily door-to-door bus service for pupils living in Arusha.
