= University of Arusha =

Coordinates: 3°19′5″S 36°52′15″E

- Chuo Kikuu cha Arusha (Swahili)
- Former name: Tanzania Adventist College
- Motto: Wholistic Human Development
- Type: Private
- Established: 2006; 20 years ago
- Affiliations: Seventh-day Adventist Church
- Vice-Chancellor: Prof. Patrick Manu
- Location: P.O. Box 7, Usa River, Arusha, Tanzania, Usa River, Arusha, Tanzania
- Campus: Rural
- Website: University Website

University of Arusha (UoA) is a chartered Tanzanian, private Christian university based in Usa River, Arumeru District, Arusha Region. It is owned and operated by the Seventh-day Adventist Church. It is a part of the Seventh-day Adventist education system, the world's second largest Christian school system.

== History ==
In 1970, the Tanzania Union Mission of the Seventh-day Adventist Church found it necessary to establish a ministerial training institution for its workers. It was located at Ikizu, 65 kilometers southeast of Musoma town, Mara Region. In 1975, the Tanzania Union Mission combined the Adventist School of Health Evangelism (ASHE) at Heri Hospital in Kigoma and the ministerial course at Ikizu. This consolidated institution was then transferred to a new site at Usa River, 24 kilometers from Arusha town, and was named Arusha Adventist Seminary (AAS).

In 1978, AAS was upgraded to a college status and named Tanzania Adventist Seminary and College (TASC). In 1992, the name was changed to Tanzania Adventist College (TAC) and the ministerial course was replaced by a two-year diploma program in theology. In 1996, TAC was affiliated to Griggs University in the USA. Under this affiliation, TAC offered BA in Theology and Religion. In 1998, the affiliation shifted from Griggs University to the University of Eastern Africa, Baraton (UEAB) in Kenya. Under this affiliation, TAC offered BA in theology and religion, BBA in accounting and management and diploma courses in education and business. Apart from the affiliation with UEAB, TAC was also a teachers‘ college under the then Ministry of Education and Culture (MEC). Under the MEC Registration Number S. 401, it offered diploma in education, diploma in secretarial science, and certificate in secretarial science.

In early 2003, TAC began the process of being a university. In September 2003, it was granted a Letter of Interim Authority (LIA) by the then Higher Education Accreditation Council (HEAC) of Tanzania, now called the Tanzania Commission for Universities (TCU). Under the LIA, TAC was authorized to carry the name the University of Arusha. In September 2004, HEAC granted the University of Arusha (UoA) a certificate of Provisional Registration No. 016. In the year 2006, the University of Arusha became fully licensed and accredited by Tanzania Commission for Universities as a graduate university. In 2009, the University of Arusha submitted the first four graduate programs to the TCU for accreditation in education and business.

The Graduate School with its programs in business and education started in November 2010 in Arusha City. Under the School of Education, the following concentrations are offered: (a) MA in educational management and (b) MA in curriculum and instruction. The faculty of business also offers three areas of concentration, and they are as follows: (a) MBA in finance and accounting, (b) MBA in strategic marketing and entrepreneurship, and (c) MBA in strategic human resource.

== Accreditation ==
The University of Arusha is accredited by Adventist Accrediting Association (AAA) of Seventh-day Adventist Schools, Colleges and Universities, and the Tanzania Commission for Universities (TCU).

== Programs and course offerings ==
Graduate Programs

- Master of Arts in Educational Management and Leadership
- Master of Arts in Curriculum & Instruction
- Master of Business Administration in Finance & Accounting
- Master of Business Administration in Marketing & Entrepreneurship
- Master of Business Administration in Human Resources & Strategic Management
- Post Graduate Diploma in Education

Undergraduate Degree Programs

- Bachelor of Arts in Theology
- Bachelor of Arts in Religion
- Bachelor of Business Administration in Accounting
- Bachelor of Business Administration in Management
- Bachelor of Business Administration in Marketing
- Bachelor of Business Administration in Office Administration & HRM
- Bachelor of Business Administration in Accounting with Education
- Bachelor of Education (options in any of the following): English, Kiswahili, Geography, History, Religion, BED Accounting

Diploma Programs

- Diploma in Theology
- Diploma in Commerce & Accounting
- Diploma in Sales and Marketing Management
- Diploma in Office Administration & HRM
- Diploma in Business Information Technology
- Diploma in Procurement and Supplies Management
- Diploma in Education

Certificate Programs

- Certificate in Theology
- Certificate in Business Information Technology
- Certificate in Records Management
- Certificate in Sales Marketing Management

== See also ==
- List of Seventh-day Adventist colleges and universities
- Seventh-day Adventist education
