= Tengeru =

- town
- Location within Tanzania
- Coordinates: 3°22′27″S 36°47′07″E
- Country: Tanzania
- Region: Arusha Region
- Elevation: 1,387 m (4,551 ft)
- Time zone: UTC+3 (EAT)
  - Summer (DST): UTC+3 (not observed)
- Climate: Cwb

Tengeru is a market-town in the Arusha Region of northern Tanzania. Located below Mount Meru on the eastern edge of the eastern branch of the Great Rift Valley, surrounding Lake Duluti, Tengeru has a temperate climate. The town is thirteen kilometres east of the city of Arusha.

== History ==
In 1934, Kenyon Painter, an American investor, established a coffee research station at Tengeru, which today is operated by the Lyamungu Research Institute of the Tanzania Ministry of Agriculture and known as the National Centre for Coffee Research.

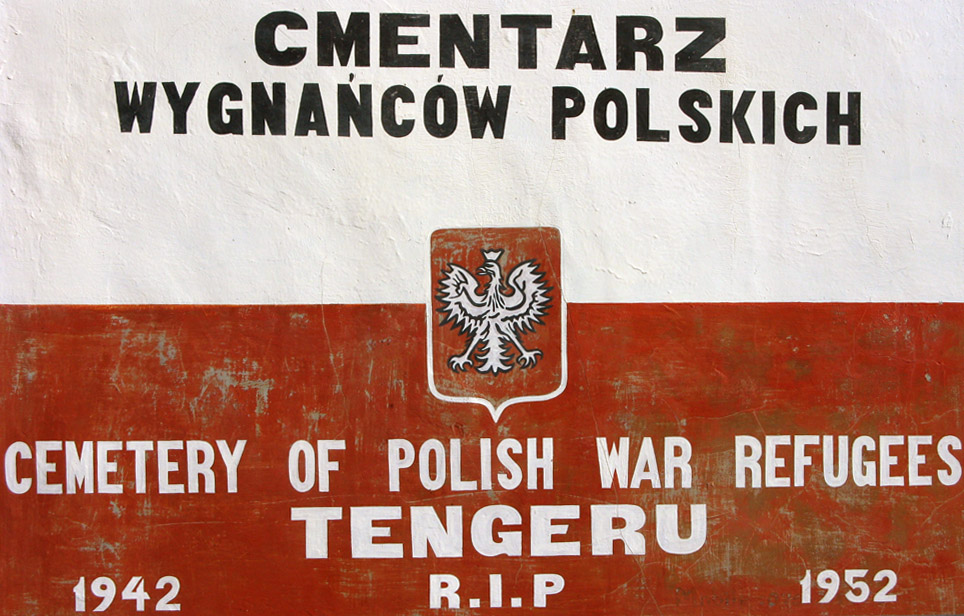
Plaque at the Cemetery of Polish War Refugees

Beginning in 1942 and continuing after World War II, a camp for displaced persons from central and eastern Europe was established at Tengeru, just south of Lake Duluti. It primarily housed Poles, who were then resettled mainly to Britain, but partly also to the United States, Australia, and other countries. At its height it housed over 4,000 people, but now all that remains of the camp is its large cemetery. The dairy and beef cattle farm that was run by the internees was taken over in 1952 by the Ministry of Agriculture and became the Tengeru Horticultural Research and Training Institute (HORTI).

Today, Tengeru has become a suburb of Arusha.

== Twin Towns ==
The town is twinned with the town of Leominster in the UK
