= Murieti =

Murieti was an administrative ward in the Arumeru district of the Arusha Region of Tanzania. With the dissolution of the Arumeru District in 2007 it has become part of the Terrat Ward in the Arusha Municipal district. According to the 2002 census, the ward has a total population of 18,188.
