= Mbuguni =

Ward in Meru District, Arusha Region

Coordinates: 3°34′S 36°57′E

- Ward
- Kata ya Mbuguni
- Location within Tanzania
- Country: Tanzania
- Region: Arusha Region
- District: Meru District

Population
  - Total: 16,130

Mbuguni is an administrative ward in the Meru District of the Arusha Region of Tanzania. The road that goes to Mererani, Manyara Region actually passes through Mbuguni ward. Making Mbuguni a trade route for the Tanzanite gemston. According to the 2002 census, the ward had a total population of 14,880.
