= Nkoanrua =

Ward in Meru District, Arusha Region

Coordinates: 3°21′0″S 36°46′0″E

- Ward
- Kata ya Nkoanrua
- Location within Tanzania
- Country: Tanzania
- Region: Arusha Region
- District: Meru District

Population
  - Total: 18,520

Nkoanrua is an administrative ward in the Meru District of the Arusha Region of Tanzania. According to the 2002 census, the ward has a total population of 14,759.
