= Ngarenanyuki =

Ward in Meru District, Arusha Region

- Ward
- Kata ya Ngarenanyuki
- Location within Tanzania
- Country: Tanzania
- Region: Arusha Region
- District: Meru District

Population
  - Total: 20,179

Ngarenanyuki is an administrative ward in the Meru District of the Arusha Region of Tanzania. The ward is the largest ward in Meru district. It is located in far north side of the district. According to the 2002 census, the ward has a total population of 16,988.
