= Wameru =

Ethnic group from Arusha Region of Tanzania

Total population
- 198,000

Regions with significant populations
- Tanzania Arusha Region (Meru District) (Arusha District Council)

Languages
- Kimeru & Swahili

Religion
- Christianity, Islam; African Traditional Religion

Related ethnic groups
- Chaga, Pare & other Bantu peoples

- Person: Mmeru
- People: Wameru
- Language: Kimeru

The Meru (also Wameru) or Rwa are a Bantu ethnic and linguistic group based on the south and eastern slopes of Mount Meru in Meru District of the Arusha Region of Tanzania, the Rwa population is estimated to number 198,000. They are culturally and linguistically related to the Chagga.

== Overview ==
Except for their shared Bantu linguistic group membership, the Wameru have no kinship links with the Ameru people of Kenya. The Wameru have a population of roughly 198,000 people as of 2015. The Meru have been active in intense agriculture and currently live on Mount Meru's southern and eastern slopes. The Meru are frequently referred to as 'Varwa,' which means 'those who climb' in the Kimeru language. 94 percent of the Meru are Christians (75 percent are Protestants and 25 percent are Catholics), and 3 percent are Muslims.

== History ==
The Wameru are said to have arrived to the slopes of the great mountain around 800 years ago coming from the mount Kenya . According to the inhabitants, migration occurred back and forth throughout the region, and the Meru people should be viewed as a part of the bigger population inhabiting the entire Arumeru District. Upon arriving at the southeastern slopes of Mount Meru they were met by the hunter-gatherer group called the Koningo whom they absorbed into Meru society. The Wameru are known for their intensive livestock keeper.

When the Arusha first came on the slopes of Mount Meru in the 1830s, the Wameru were already there. In the 1830s, the Wameru also created the Arusha township. The Meru kept the name of one of their leaders, Rari II (also known as Ndemi), who ruled until 1887. The leader made substantial contributions to the economy, particularly agriculture, by introducing new crops such as millet, maize, and bananas. He popularized pottery and iron crafts.

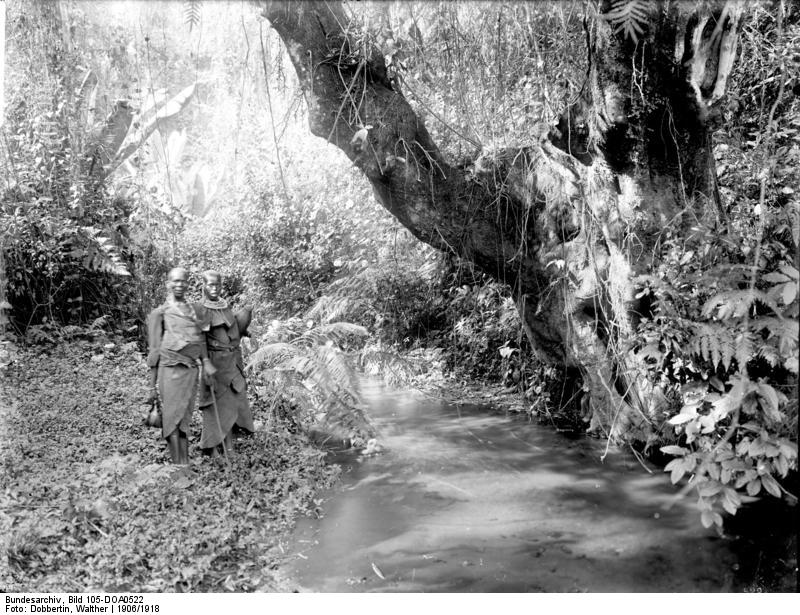
Rwa (Meru) women in c.1890s

In 1896, punitive expeditions were conducted by the German colonizers against both Arusha and Meru, during which a great number of Arusha and Meru were slain, their cattle confiscated, and banana groves were burned down to make way for European farmers. This land was soon colonized by Afrikaners who moved from South Africa. With the establishment of British colonial administration in 1916, the Wameru began to actively expand their towns and farms in the surrounding area, thereby expanding their agricultural crop planting area.Coffee had been the most profitable agricultural product for Meru farmers by the 1920s. They also cultivated bananas, maize, and beans.

== Language ==
The Kimeru language, spoken by the Meru, is a Bantu language that is closely connected to one of the dialects of the Chagga language of West Kilimanjaro. The Meru are culturally and linguistically related to the Chagga. According to most analysts, this similarity is not by chance: a historically large number of Wameru clans believed themselves the descendants of Machame and Siha/Ng'uni groupings affiliated with the Chagga ethnic community. One version claims that approximately 400 years ago, inhabitants from the Machame area traveled away from the Kilimanjaro slopes and toward Mount Meru.

== Society ==
Traditionally, the Meru are an example of a patriarchal society. The patriarchy, or institutionalized male domination over women and children in the household and society, was the norm for them. The Meru are organized according to the traditional clan structure, with 26 clans. Most experts assume that the bulk of Meru clans are descended from the Chagga, with only a few clans having Maasai ancestors, such as Pallangyo, Nko, and Sikawa.

The four most senior Meru clans all claim Shambaa ancestry (Mbise, Kaaya, Akyoo, and Sumari), while the rest of the Bantu origin clans are Chagga (Ndosi, Nanyaro, Urio, and Nasari). Researchers believe that the high-status clans purposefully insist on a non-Chagga origin. In this way, they attempt to distinguish themselves from the politically dominant and numerous Chagga neighbors. In this setting, the Mbise, Kaaya, and Sumari regard the Machame as sibling groups rather than ancestors.

Each Meru clan is said to be descended from a common ancestor, who was often an earlier inhabitant on Mount Meru's slopes. As a result, each part of Meruland has been identified with and named after a prominent and respected ancestor. Poli, Urisho, Sura, Sing'isi, Mulala, Nkoaranga, Nsupo, Ndati, Kimundo, Ndoombo, Akeri, Ikona, and Nkoanrua are some of the current localities.

Each region is affiliated with a specific clan. Poli, for example, is the home of the Sumari clan, whereas Kimundo is the home of the Kaaya. Although most clans live in a specific area of Meruland, certain clans may not have their own territory and may be distributed around the country. Two clans are used as examples: Urio and Kitomari.

Additionally, each Meru clan has been given a certain set of skills and tasks to accomplish for the public. Members of the clan Mbise, for example, were said to have the magical power of diviners and rainmakers (this clan occupied the highest place in the Meru's social system). The men of the Kaaya clan inherited political power and magical might, while the members of the Sarajija clan had life-giving power and their blessing offered security for dwellings and gardens.

The Maasai clan Sikawa was associated with blacksmiths and represented one of the lowest rung of the social hierarchy. It is worth noting that the blacksmith clan in the pastoralist Datoga society holds a similar low social rank. The Meru clan structure is currently progressively being dismantled. This is a result of the state strategy of Julius Nyerere's government in the 1960s, which was largely aimed at creating an unified Tanzanian country with a common language (Swahili) and cultural traditions.

=== Conflict with the Warusha ===
The relationship between Bantu Meru clans and Arusha (Maasai) groups intensified beginning in the mid-nineteenth century. According to historical records, the Arusha came on the slopes of Mount Arusha when the Meru people had already established around Mount Meru. The Arusha people settled in the valley south of Mount Kilimanjaro and farmed cattle and corn. The Arusha, who lived close to Mount Meru, actively assaulted their neighbors, stealing their herds and enslaving them. The Meru attempted to repel military assaults by establishing their own military structures. By the end of the nineteenth century, the Meru and Arusha had developed an ethnic identity.

== Traditional lifestyle ==
Because of the exceptional fertility of the local soil, Meruland is now characterized by high human density and agricultural specialization. Bananas, mangoes, avocados, coffee, tomatoes, legumes, and grains such as maize, rice, millet, and sorghum are grown on modern Meru. In addition, due to a severe dearth of grazing area, the Meru now have a limited number of animals. However, the Wameru kept enormous herds of cattle on the open pasture in the late nineteenth century. The shift in land use priorities can be explained by the early twentieth-century switch to cultivating a variety of products for sale (mainly coffee).

A farm ('kihamba') is a farmhouse of a single family that runs on the labor of its members. The soil of the household is not just used for agriculture; a portion of the land can be occupied by trees that provide wood for construction and fuel for the fire. Historically, the Meru erected spherical dwellings covered in banana leaves, but such houses are now rare in Meruland. The majority of the Meru live in masonry houses with galvanized iron sheet roofs.

The land in the homestead is passed down through the male line from father to son. Simultaneously, the youngest son gets the family household, comprising the parents' house and the majority of the land plot, while the elder sons take their land plots and must start from scratch to build a house and arrange the economy. When the father grows older, the eldest son must assume parental obligations and care for the younger children. The junior son never leaves his father's house and must care for his parents till they die.

Daughters also receive a dowry from their parents in the form of small and large animals, which the woman, her husband, and children can utilize after marriage. However, in polygamous families, cattle ownership and use is restricted to the woman and her progeny. Among the Datoga, similar rituals of acquiring animals for a woman are observed.

== Family ==
Polygamy has long been practiced among the Meru. Polygamous males had more children, which meant more laborers to manage more land. Women in polygamous families are also in a better position because all women share the workload and care for the children. As a result, polygamous families are wealthier and better off. According to Meru traditions, a male can have as many wives as he can support. His first wife later assists him in choosing subsequent wives.

All of the wives recognize her dominant position. At the same time, all children in a polygamous family receive an equal share of the inheritance (with the exception of the youngest son, who inherits the house and his father's land).

The Meru polygamous household has a separate house for the father (which is an analogue of said male house) where the father and each wife's grown-up boys live, as well as separate houses for each wife where women live with young children. Boys move to their father's house at the age of 10, while girls remain in their mother's house until they marry. The mother's status in Meru society was traditionally fairly high. The Meru, on the other hand, exclusively rewarded women who had three or more children.

Clothing was used to symbolize this transition: following the birth of her third child, a lady switches from a short fringed leather skirt to a long skirt made of long leather stripes.

=== Birth ===
Traditionally, the birth takes place in the woman's home, with the assistance of a specially trained midwife. While resting on the bed, the woman gives birth. Disposable razors are used to cut the cord (special knife in the past). The afterbirth is buried near the bed in the ground. The average time between births is two to three years.

The birth ceremony is required. First, the woman's mother-in-law pays her a visit. She brings goodies such as milk and butter. Then her neighbors come to see her. They produce loud hooting sounds as they approach the house, indicating global joy. As a result, the entire district learns about a new member of society. A youngster is given a small quantity of mashed fried banana two to three days after birth.

Breast-fed babies live for one to one and a half years. During this moment, a child is sleeping in the same bed as his mother. According to Meru tradition, a kid must receive the name of a recently deceased family member, but the true name must be kept hidden from others.

== Justice ==
Family violence may occur among the Meru. A husband can beat his wife, but society does not condone it. In this scenario, a lady has the right to seek assistance from the elders. The assembled assembly of village elders will summon husband and wife to explain the reasons for their wrongdoing. Typically, the husband will pay a penalty to his wife.

The woman's relatives (father or brothers) will insist that her husband be punished. When her own relatives are far away, a woman may seek assistance from neighborhood elders or her husband's relatives. The Meru people's last Constitution, based on customary law, has a provision that expands female rights. It is specifically mentioned that if her husband drives her out of the house, she has the right to claim her husband's land or that her husband's clan must supply her with a piece of land. Furthermore, if her husband commits major physical abuse, he must pay a monetary punishment in the form of livestock.

== Traditional education ==
Both parents educate their children in accordance with the gender principle. The mother teaches girls, while the father teaches boys. Parents have the authority to discipline their children for a variety of infractions by using a stick (rod) or just slapping with their hand. However, certain guidelines must be followed: if the father is there, the punishment may be carried out alone by him. In his absence, the mother has the authority to discipline her children for wrongdoing. However, fathers cannot reprimand grown-up females because it is completely forbidden for the father to touch her. In this situation, the penalty is carried by the mother.

== Initiation rites ==
The Meru have traditionally practiced both male and female circumcision. Immigrants from the Kilimanjaro region introduced the practice of female circumcision. The traditional female circumcision, known as clitoridectomy, was performed as part of the female initiation ritual. A properly trained woman conducted the circumcision using a special ritual knife. Currently, female circumcision is done using a single blade razor. During British colonial authority, female circumcision was formally prohibited. The planning of a daughter's circumcision resulted in a penalty for the parents responsible, according to a specially drafted law. Attempts to prohibit this and similar operations, however, were futile, and circumcisions were simply carried out in secret.

Female circumcision was harshly persecuted after Julius Nyerere came to power. Nonetheless, this custom lives on in a modified form today. Girls are now circumcised while they are infants, when before this rite was performed when they reached puberty.

As a result, the circumcision ceremony no longer served as a symbol of female initiation, marking the shift from adolescence to the age of a mature woman capable of childbearing. It is vital to stress that the custom of female circumcision, whatever it was and is now, does not entail the association of women in age classes and does not aim to contribute to the formation of coherent female organizations. According to some anthropologists, this ceremony likely conveys the core idea of younger women's subordination to the eldest, as well as the idea of daughters' obedience to mothers, rather than the principle of gender discrimination.

Meru ladies were the main defenders of the rite. Thus, it would be incorrect to interpret Meru excision as a sign of masculine discrimination towards women or an aim to deprive women of sexuality and sexual drive. Some studies believe that this procedure equalizes women's standing with men who also undergo circumcision, helping them to recognize their relevance and worth in society.

Male circumcision was also practiced by the Meru, which originated with a similar tradition among the Chagga people. Male circumcision was first practiced by Mbise clan members. However, they lacked the Morans Institute (warriors). The initiation, which was accompanied by circumcision of boys, granted membership in a specific age group within a specific clan. Despite the fact that men become brothers as a result of the initiation, this unit does not function as an autonomous military or political organization.

Each group of initiating boys choose a leader from among themselves, according to this tradition. These clan chiefs had to submit to the clan chief. Those in turn must submit to the supreme king (Mangi). In general sessions, all clan chiefs represent their clans before the Mangi.

After initiation, Meru young males became members of a certain age group, which grew into a warrior group as a result of encounters with the Arusha. Meru was initiated into Talala (a Maasai loibon village) and attained the morans status with Maasai boys from 1881 to 1929. A young Meru's parents would pay for his or her admission into loibon with tobacco and goats. During this time, the Meru joined the two succeeding Maasai age groups: Tuati (1896-1917) and Tareto (1911–1929). Until 1959, the Meru continued to engage in the initiation with the Maasai and shared age-sets with them.

After that, they broke away from the Arusha and continued to form their own warrior units, giving their own titles to each generation set, which differed from the Maasai names for their generation sets. However, the general organizational principles of such units are similar to those of the Maasai: each such unit chooses its own leader (laigvanani in Maa, means commander), whose primacy is strictly recognized by all members of the age-set; the leader serves simultaneously as a mediator in all internal conflicts, and he is delegated to the appropriate speaker to navigate conflicts with other agesets.

Thus, in Meru society, the entire male population is classified as a 'rika' (age-sets). After circumcision, young males enter the youngest rika. It takes roughly 15 years to unite young males into one rika. Each rika has its own leader and operates as a distinct fighting unit.

== Religion ==
Initially, there was open antagonism to Christian beliefs in Meru society, and missionaries were met with hostility. The first Meru who converted to Christianity in 1905 were regarded to have lost their identity and were completely shunned. Luke Kaaya, Nderingo Palangyo, and Yohana Ndosi were among the first Meru converts to Christianity in 1905. After receiving thorough training in the Marangu missionary center, they returned to Meruland and became directors of newly opened schools for the local people.

At the start of the Christianization process, women actively rejected missionaries' attempts to enroll their children in school. If that happened, they would shave their heads and mourn their children as dead. The Meru had a hostile attitude toward Christianization for obvious reasons: missionaries convinced the Meru to abolish polygamy, stated that traditional beliefs were not pleasing to God, and denounced female circumcision. That is they condemned cultural and moral norms of the Meru, and obviously, the Meru could have shardly accepted this.

By 1912, things had begun to change, and some Meru girls began to attend a day school (Spear 1997: 101–102). Meru's Christianization intensified after 1916. During this time period, missionaries began to demonstrate greater loyalty and tolerance with Meru traditional customs. The vast majority of Meruans are Christians today. But they say that this has nothing to do with their traditional or ethnic identities. Many Christians are proud of their ethnic backgrounds and are well acquainted with cultural traditions. They observe ancient practices, visit traditional sacred shrines, and worship traditional deities.

== Traditional authority and decline ==
Mangi's traditional authority was appreciative. The Mangi from the Kaaya clan who had come to the Arusha region inherited the traditions of the preceding Mangi (according to Meru elders, all their Mangi descended from the Shambaa). It was considered that Mangi looked for all the people and the country inhabited by the Meruans. Furthermore, he was the principal judge, and the sentenced individuals were flogged with sticks and subsequently put to prison as a result of his decision. Furthermore, such criminals were required to pay Mangi penalties for their mistakes.

While the title of Mangi was previously hereditary, it was eventually abolished due to pressure from the colonial authorities (first German, then British). The chiefs were chosen based on their ability, popularity among the people, and devotion to the colonial government. In Poli, the German colonial authorities built a brick residence. Mangi ruled his people from here, holding regular meetings, making crucial decisions, and resolving clan disagreements and disputes. This house is still standing in Poli as a historical relic. Today, local authorities are attempting to rehabilitate it and convert it into the Meru History Museum.

=== Decline of the Mangi rule ===
The establishment of moran's organizations among Meru's youth created some social conflict in the community. The morans stopped obeying not only the clan chiefs, but also the Mangi. Moran parties began attacking, robbing neighbors and stealing their cattle. They were almost deaf to the supreme leader's bans. The following information was found in one of those documents. The first Europeans to enter Meruland in 1887 were promptly robbed by a group of teenage warriors from Meru and Arusha. The victims went to Mangi Matunda to complain. However, he failed to provide genuine assistance to these folks. The Mangi admitted that morans obeyed the orders of their elected leaders but not himself. Thus, the gradual transition of Meru's social organization in the direction of Maasai-style paramilitary formations resulted in significant decentralization of Meru society in the late nineteenth century.

== Modern history ==
The tribal constitution was established in 1948. During this time, the Meru refused to work with the colonial administration and boycotted Mangi because they believed the local monarch was supporting the colonial authorities in gaining their tribal territory, and hence requested his resignation. The British attempted to crush the insurrection by deporting most of its leaders, but inadvertently exacerbated matters: many Meru joined the Kilimanjaro Citizens' Union (KCU), which had been established by the Chagga with the goal of undermining the power of local traditional rulers. Although this Constitution was never used, the Meru recognized the supremacy of its fundamental concepts.

On January 1, 1951, the Meru formed their own political party, the Meru Citizens' Union (MCU), after breaking away from the KCU. On February 24, the Meru chose their first Paramount Chief, Nshili Nnini (which means "a large leader"), using the same word "nshili" that was used to refer to a clan head alongside the pro-British Mangi. Kirilo Japhet, who was also the Secretary of the ATA's local branch in Arusha at the time, led the new national party.

The precedent was known as 'The Meru Land Case' 1951 in historical records. The confrontation between colonial authority and Meru was caused by the illegal displacement of 3,000 farmers from their ancestral lands in Engare Nanyuki and the transfer of these fertile fields to European farmers. Despite the fact that the tribe protest had no effect, Meru did not accept the colonial rulers' acts. They sent Kirilo Japhet to represent their rights to the United Nations, where the case of indigenous peoples' rights violations was being considered. The United Nations acknowledged that the British colonial authority had acted illegally and passed the resolution in favor of Meru.

The land should be returned to Meru as originally belonged to them by law,' declared the UN resolution. The British authorities, on the other hand, simply ignored the UN resolution. The Meru Community was never going to give up. Japhet conferred with other TAA leaders, Julius Nyerere and S. Kandoro, on probable next steps. They instructed him to travel through Tanganyika informing the entire country about the violation of his people's rights and the British disregard for the UN ruling in favor of the Meru. 'The Meru Land Case' became a nationwide business over time, and TAA leaders, notably Julius Nyerere, utilized it to construct the political demands of their party platform in 1954). The Meru revered K. Japhet as their national hero, dubbed 'Merishai' (in KiMeru).

Julius Nyerere dealt the ultimate blow to Meru tribal organization and traditional tribe leadership. Previously, Mangi was formally in charge of administrative functions related to colonial authorities, while Nshili Nnini was in charge of internal matters. Mangi's power was finally destroyed in 1963, and Nshili Nnini remained the lone representative of tribal power (Baroin 2003: 154, 157). His primary responsibility was to execute tribal customary law in conformity with the tribe constitution and intentions. He never made judgments on his own; he always sought consensus, and all problems of general concern were considered in tribal councils or public forums.

Despite the fact that Mangi had lost his position as Meru's leader, clan leaders still wield influence and regulate the lives of Meru's small communities. For example, a major crime is handled by the police, but litigation and land disputes, as well as violent behavior by young people, are still handled by the local elders.

== Present ==
Meru now reside not just on the slopes of Mount Meru, but also in the valley at its base. Such communities are quickly transformed into tiny towns. Madji ja Chai, Leguruku, Ngare Nanyuki, Tengeru, and Usa River are a few examples. Tanzanian Meru can also be found in Arusha, Moshi, and Karatu. They work in agriculture and handicrafts (pottery). Among the Meru are members of Tanzania's modern middle class: doctors, teachers, lawyers, engineers, and military professionals.

Modern Meru's tight settlement zones are also distinguished by high levels of education: practically all children attend school nowadays, and 90% of the adult population has completed at least 7 years of basic school. Furthermore, by Tanzanian standards, the degree of medicine in the Meru region is high. According to Tanzania's Ministry of Health, 100% of women in this region give birth in a hospital nowadays, and children under the age of one year are routinely examined and vaccinated. As a result, small child mortality rates in Meru's compact dwelling zones are among the lowest in Tanzania.
