= Nkoaranga =

Ward in Meru District, Arusha Region

Coordinates: 3°20′0″S 36°48′0″E

- Ward
- Kata ya Nkoaranga
- Location within Tanzania
- Country: Tanzania
- Region: Arusha Region
- District: Meru District

Population
  - Total: 13,929

Nkoaranga is an administrative ward in the Meru District of the Arusha Region of Tanzania. the ward is home to part of the Arusha National Park, Nkoaranga Hospital and the Ngaresero Lodge. According to the 2002 census, the ward has a total population of 13,338.
