= Lake Duluti =

Lake in Arusha Region, Tanzania

Coordinates: 3.386°S 36.789°E

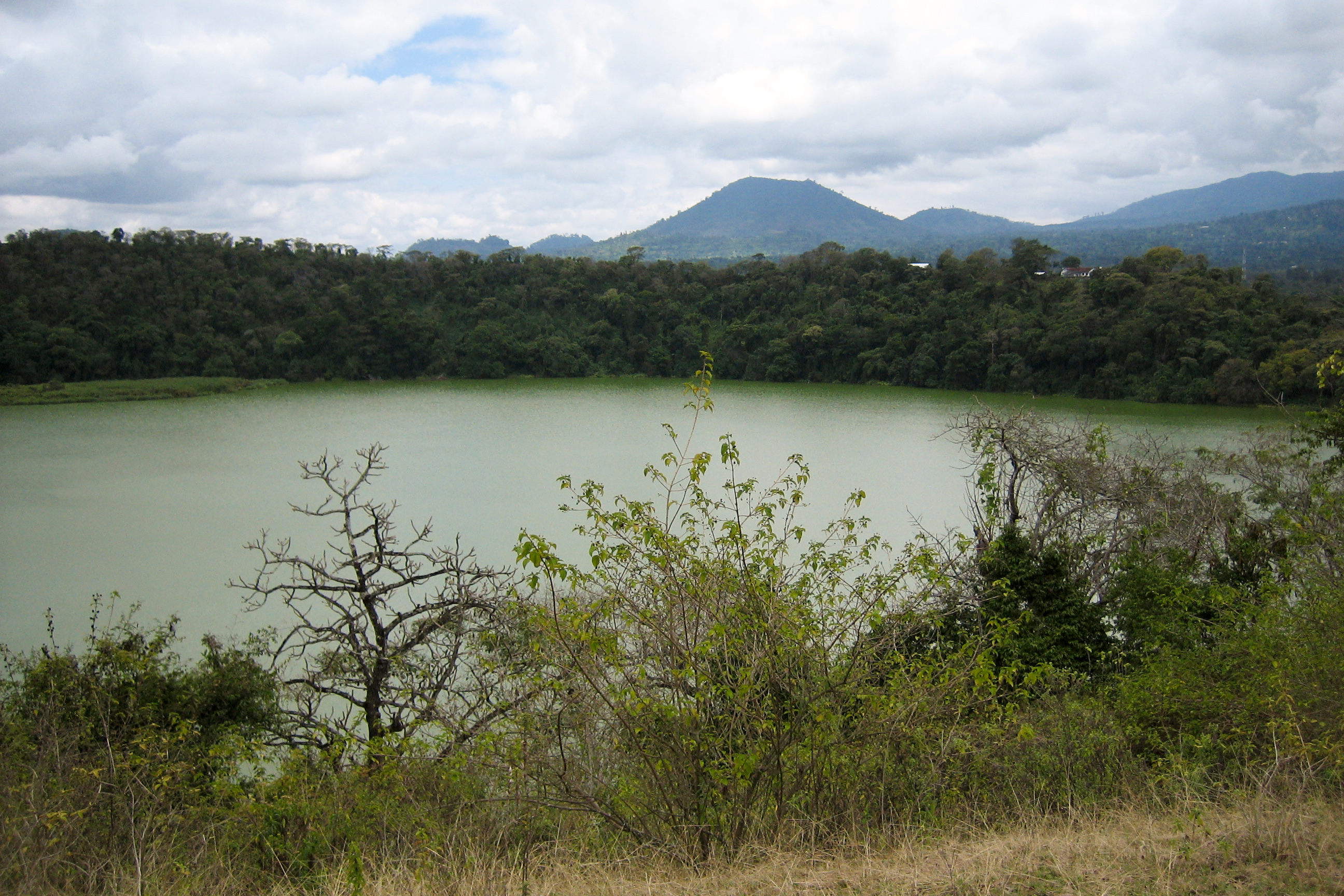
- Lake Duluti

- Location within Tanzania
- Location: Arusha District
- Type: Natural freshwater lake, volcanic crater lake
- Basin countries: Tanzania
- Max. length: 1.11 km (0.69 mi)
- Max. width: 0.73 km (0.45 mi)
- Surface area: 0.6 km^{2} (0.23 sq mi)
- Max. depth: 9 m (30 ft)
- Surface elevation: 1,290 m (4,230 ft)

Lake Duluti is a volcanic crater lake in the Arusha region of Tanzania, on the eastern edge of the eastern branch of the Great Rift Valley. It is located in Meru District near the town of Tengeru and is 14 kilometres (8.7 mi) from Arusha city centre and 1.31 kilometres (0.81 mi) from the Arusha-Moshi road.

Lake Duluti covers about 63 hectares (160 acres), and the surrounding Duluti Forestry Reserve covers about 19 hectares (47 acres) of land. The deepest part of the lake, in its center, is about 9 m (30 ft) deep; the shallow parts are at the lake's shore, where the depth varies from side to side. A road from the Arusha-Moshi road leads to a restaurant on the Northern shore of the lake, where canoes can be hired.
