= Makiba =

Ward in Meru District, Arusha Region

- Ward
- Kata ya Makiba
- Location within Tanzania
- Country: Tanzania
- Region: Arusha Region
- District: Meru District

Population
  - Total: 11,874

Makiba is an administrative ward in the Meru District of the Arusha Region of Tanzania. The ward is bordered by Mererani ward located in Manyara Region which is the only source of Tanzanite on earth. Makiba is a transit ward to Merenani from Arusha Region, the largest importer of the gemstone. According to the 2002 census, the ward has a total population of 12,056.
