= King'ori =

Ward in Meru District, Arusha Region

- Ward
- Kata ya King'ori
- Location within Tanzania
- Country: Tanzania
- Region: Arusha Region
- District: Meru District

Population
  - Total: 23,280

King'ori is an administrative ward in the Meru District of the Arusha Region of Tanzania. According to the 2002 census, the ward has a total population of 20,670.
