= Nkoarisambu =

Ward in Meru District, Arusha Region

- Ward
- Kata ya Nkoarisambu
- Location within Tanzania
- Country: Tanzania
- Region: Arusha Region
- District: Meru District

Population
  - Total: 7,359

Nkoarisambu is an administrative ward in the Meru District of the Arusha Region of Tanzania. The ward is the least populous ward in the district. According to the 2002 census, the ward has a total population of 6,497.
