= Kikatiti =

Ward in Meru District, Arusha Region

- Ward
- Kata ya Kikatiti
- Location within Tanzania
- Country: Tanzania
- Region: Arusha Region
- District: Meru District

Population
  - Total: 13,699

Kikatiti is an administrative ward in the Meru District of the Arusha Region of Tanzania. According to the 2012 census, the ward has a total population of 16,775.
