= Maroroni =

Ward in Meru District, Arusha Region

- Ward
- Kata ya Maroroni
- Location within Tanzania
- Country: Tanzania
- Region: Arusha Region
- District: Meru District

Population
  - Total: 14,103

Maroroni is an administrative ward in the Meru District of the Arusha Region of Tanzania. The ward is home to the privately owned Kilimanjaro Golf and Wildlife sanctuary. According to the 2002 census, the ward has a total population of 12,001.
