= Seela Sing'isi =

Ward in Meru District, Arusha Region

Seela Sing'isi Ward Kata ya Seela Sing'isi (Swahili)
- Ward
- Kata ya Seela Sing'isi
- Location within Tanzania
- Country: Tanzania
- Region: Arusha Region
- District: Meru District

Area
  - Total: 11.61 km^{2} (4.48 sq mi)
- Elevation: 1,285 m (4,216 ft)

Population (2012)
  - Total: 29,313
  - Density: 2,525/km^{2} (6,539/sq mi)

Seela Sing'isi is an administrative ward in the Meru District of the Arusha Region of Tanzania. The ward covers an area of 11.61 km^{2} (4.48 sq mi), and has an average elevation of 1,285 m (4,216 ft). According to the 2012 census, the ward has a total population of 10,109.
