= Mount Meru (Tanzania) =

Dormant stratovolcano in Arusha Region, Tanzania

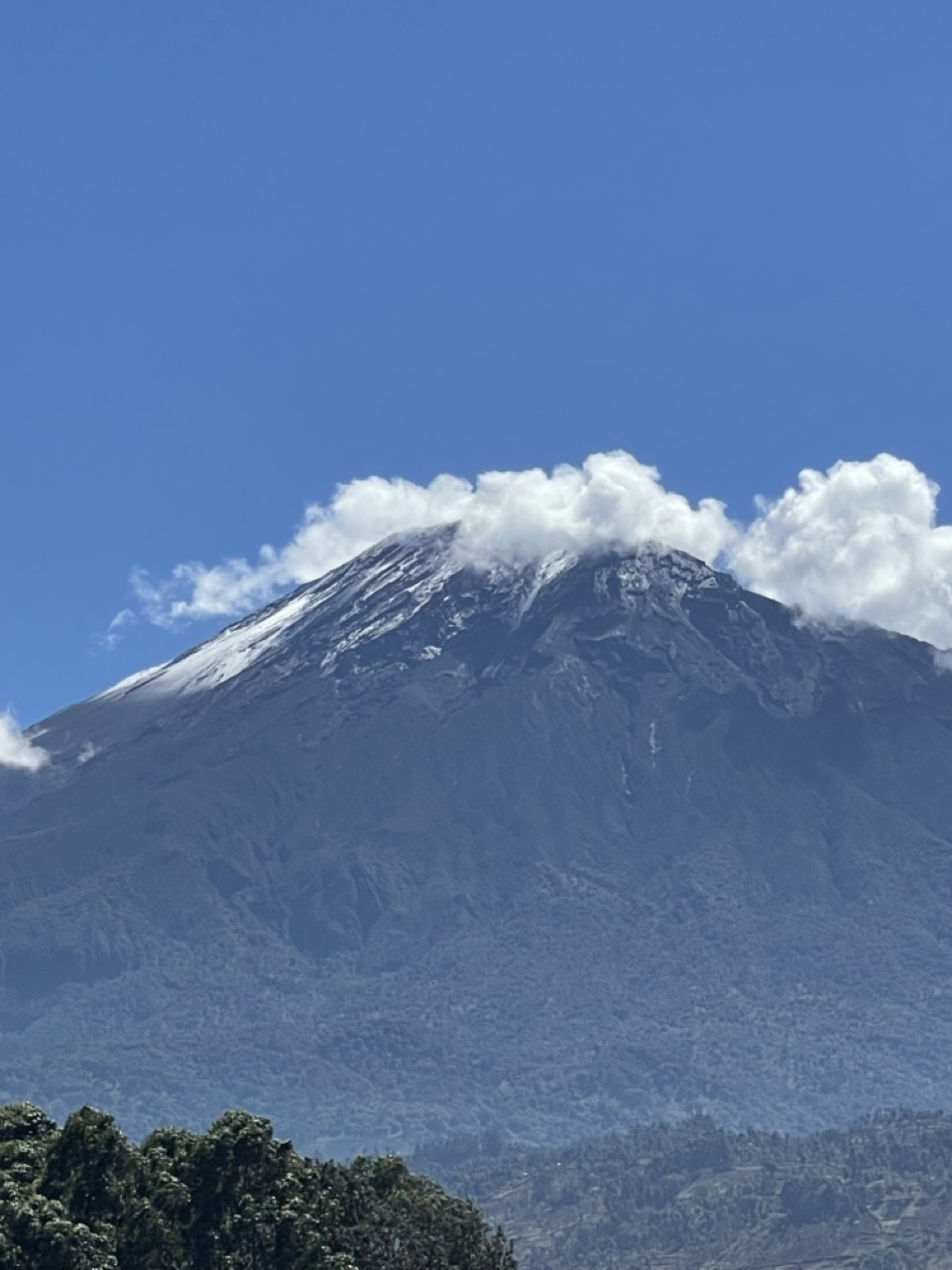
- Mount Meru with snow

Highest point
- Elevation: 4,562.13 m (14,967.6 ft)
- Prominence: 3,170 m (10,400 ft); Ranked 72nd
- Listing: Ultra; Mountains of Africa 8th
- Coordinates: 3°14′48″S 36°44′54″E

Geography
- Location within Tanzania Location within Africa Location within Earth
- Location: Arusha Region, Tanzania

Geology
- Formed by: Volcanism along the Gregory Rift
- Mountain type: Stratovolcano
- Last eruption: October to December 1910

Climbing
- First ascent: 1904 by Fritz Jäger
- Easiest route: Hike

Mount Meru is a dormant stratovolcano located 70 kilometres (43 mi) west of Kilimanjaro in southeast Arusha Region, Tanzania. At a height of 4,562.13 metres (14,968 ft), it is visible from Mount Kilimanjaro on a clear day, and is the eighth-highest mountain of Africa. (Note: Using 500 meters of topographic prominence as the cutoff for an independent mountain.)

Mount Meru is located just north of the city of Arusha, in the Arusha Region of Tanzania. It is the second-highest mountain in Tanzania, after Mount Kilimanjaro, and the highest mountain in Arusha Region. The Momella route – which starts at Momella gate, on the eastern side of the mountain – is the most common route for climbers to reach the peak. The peak is called "Socialist Peak".

Mount Meru's lavas are alkaline in character and include nephelinite. Much of the mountain's height was lost about 7,800 years ago due to a summit collapse. Mount Meru most recently had a minor eruption in 1910. The several small cones and craters seen in the vicinity probably reflect numerous episodes of volcanic activity. Mount Meru's caldera is 2.2 miles (3.5 km) wide.

Mount Meru is the topographic centerpiece of Arusha National Park. Its fertile slopes rise above the surrounding savanna and support a forest that hosts diverse wildlife, including nearly 400 species of birds, as well as monkeys and leopards.

In 1896, the Sack of Meru, a series of conflicts fought between the German Empire and the Chagga states versus the Meru and Warusha, occurred on Mount Meru's slopes.

The movie Hatari! was filmed at the foot of Mountain Meru.

On September 20, 2015, satellite imagery showed a plume rising on north flank of Mount Meru. This was first thought to have been an eruption, however later evidence showed the plume was created by a wildfire, not an eruption.

== See also ==
- Geography of Tanzania
- List of volcanoes in Tanzania
- List of Ultras of Africa
