= Arusha National Park =

National Park in Tanzania

- IUCN category II (national park)
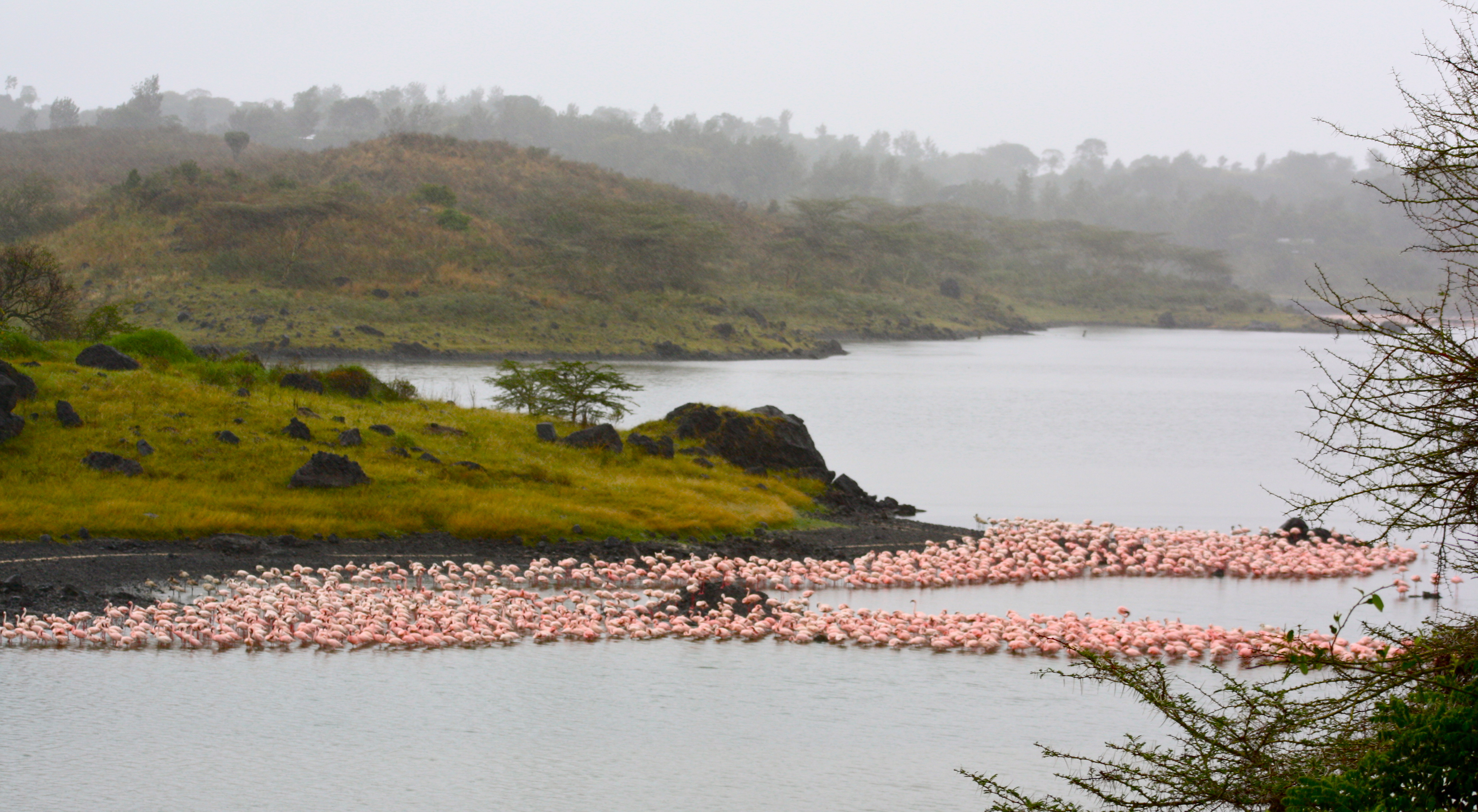

- Location within Tanzania
- Location: Arusha Region, Tanzania
- Coordinates: 3°15′S 36°50′E
- Area: 137 km^{2} (53 sq mi)
- Established: 1960
- Visitors: 66,808 (in 2012)
- Governing body: Tanzania National Parks Authority
- Website: Park website

Arusha National Park covers Mount Meru, a prominent volcano with an elevation of 4566 m, in the Arusha Region of north eastern Tanzania. The park is small but varied with spectacular landscapes in three distinct areas. In the west, the Meru Crater funnels the Jekukumia River; the peak of Mount Meru lies on its rim. Ngurdoto Crater in the south-east is grassland. The shallow alkaline Momella Lakes in the north-east have varying algal colours and are known for their wading birds.

Mount Meru is the second highest peak in Tanzania after Mount Kilimanjaro, which is just 60 km away and forms a backdrop to views from the park to the east. Arusha National Park lies on a 300-kilometre axis of Africa's most famous national parks, running from Serengeti and Ngorongoro Crater in the west to Kilimanjaro National Park in the east.

The park is just a few kilometres north east of Arusha, though the main gate is 25 km east of the city. It is also 58 km from Moshi and 35 km from Kilimanjaro International Airport (KIA).

== Wildlife ==
Arusha National Park has a rich variety of wildlife, but visitors shouldn't expect the same game-viewing experience they find in other national parks of Tanzania's northern circuit. Despite the small size of the park, common animals include giraffe, Cape buffalo, zebra, warthog, the black-and-white colobus monkey, the blue monkey, flamingo, elephant, bushbuck and many other African animals. Leopard populations are present, but rarely seen. Birdlife in the forest is prolific, with many forest species more easily seen here than elsewhere on the tourist route - Narina trogon and bar-tailed trogon are both possible highlights for visiting birders, whilst the range of starling species provide somewhat less gaudy interest.

== Gallery ==
Gallery

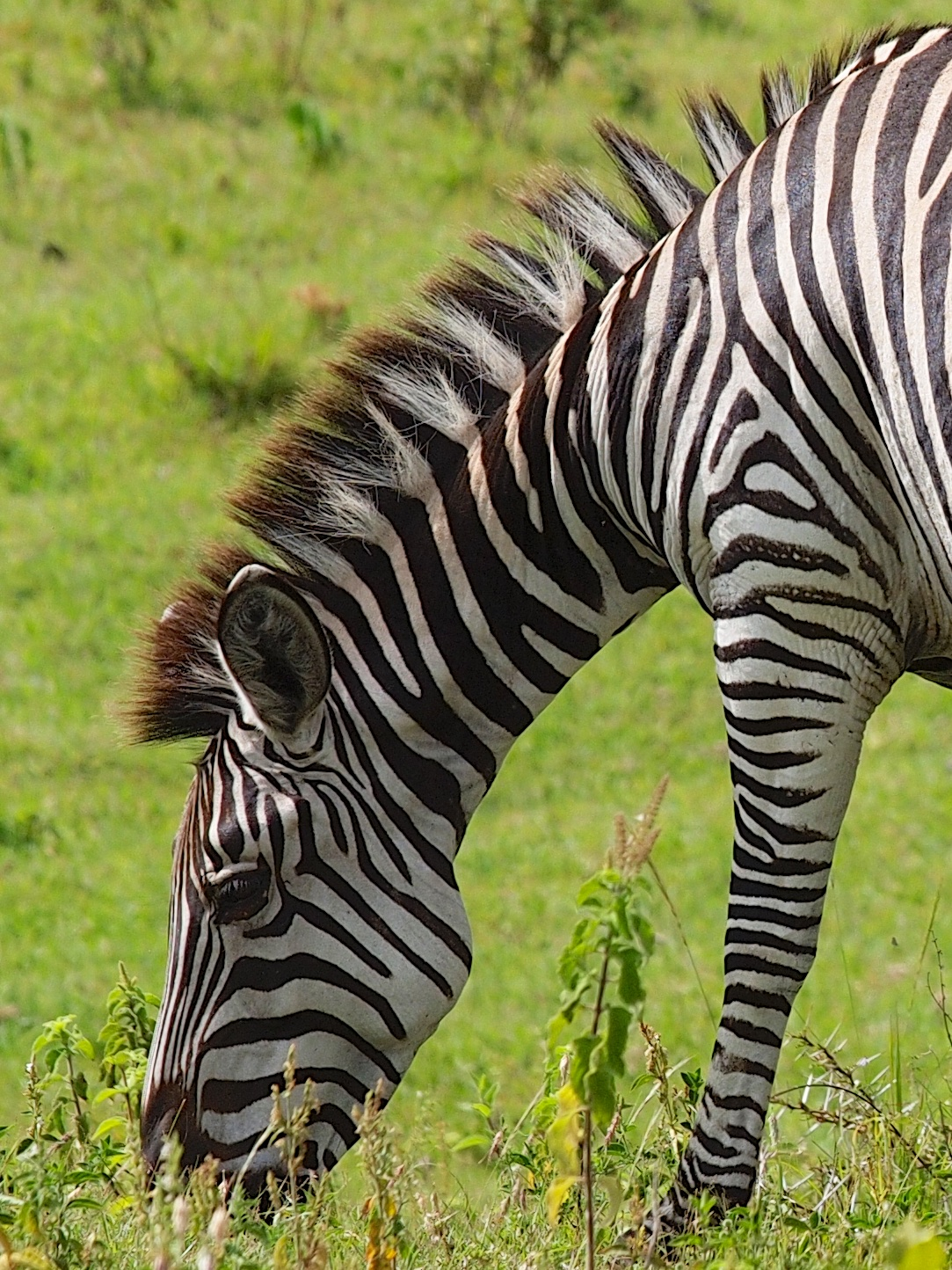
Zebra Arusha NP 2015

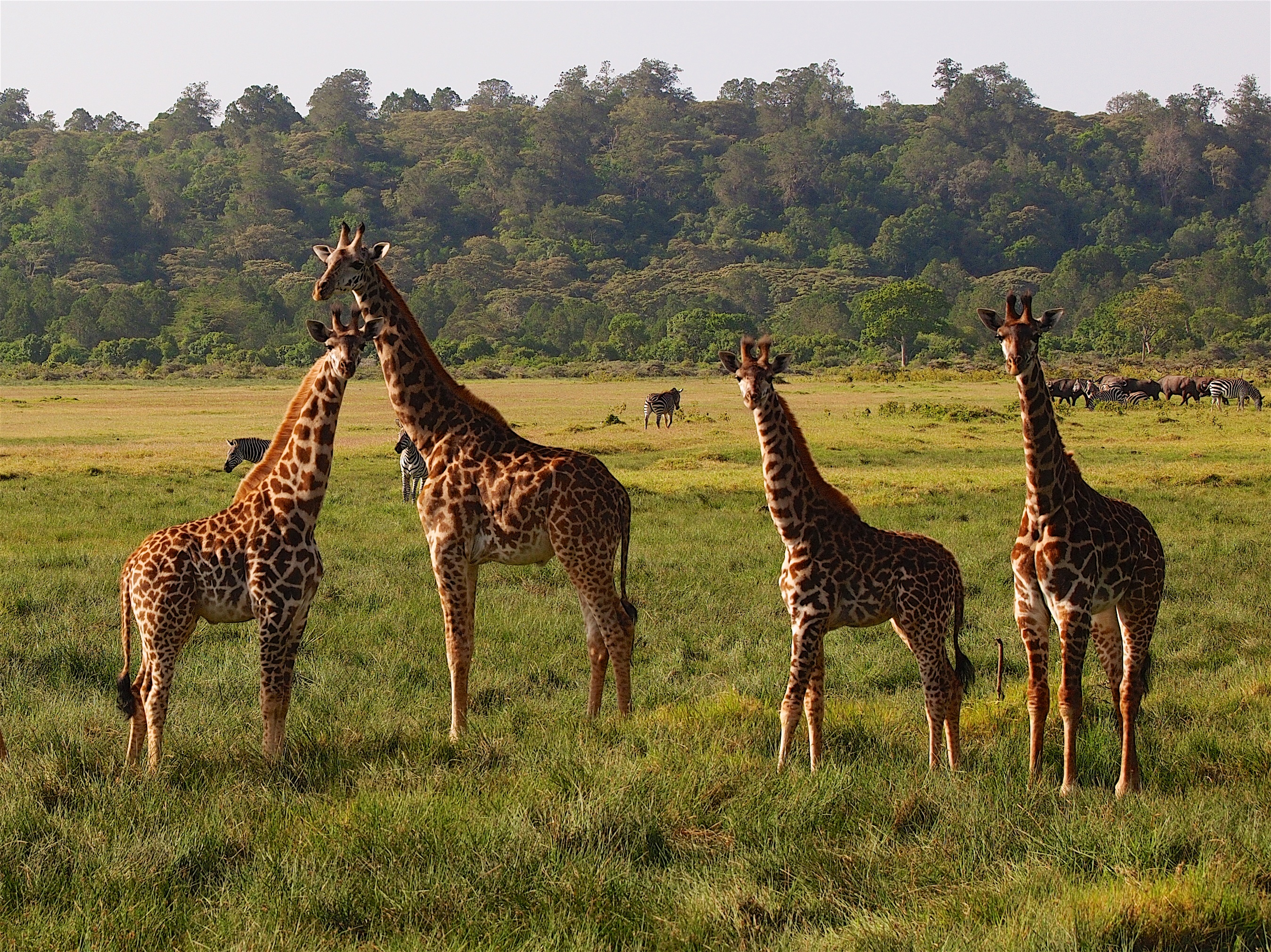
Young giraffe with zebra and cape buffalo.

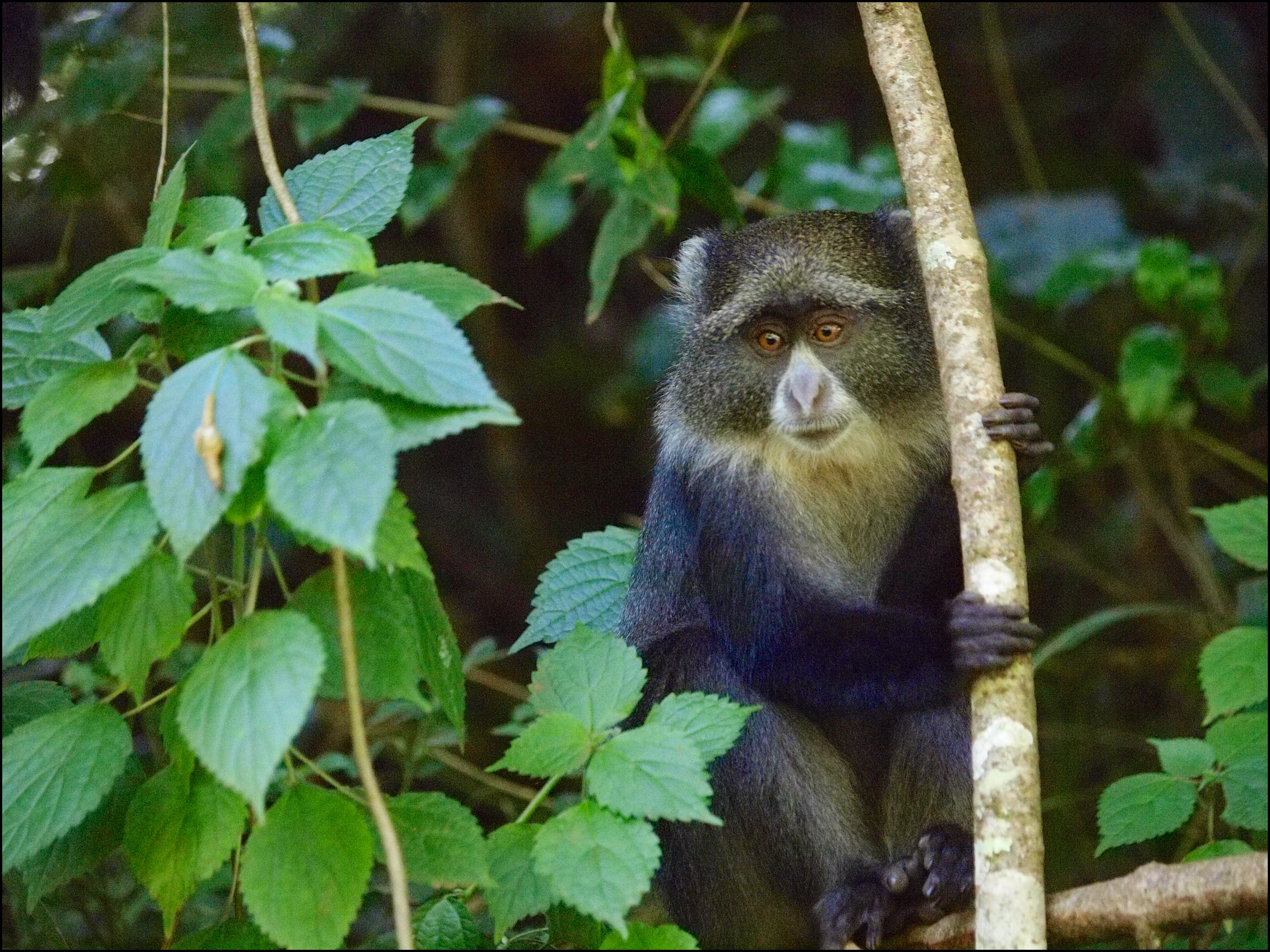
Blue monkey (Cercopithecus mitis), Arusha National Park (2015)

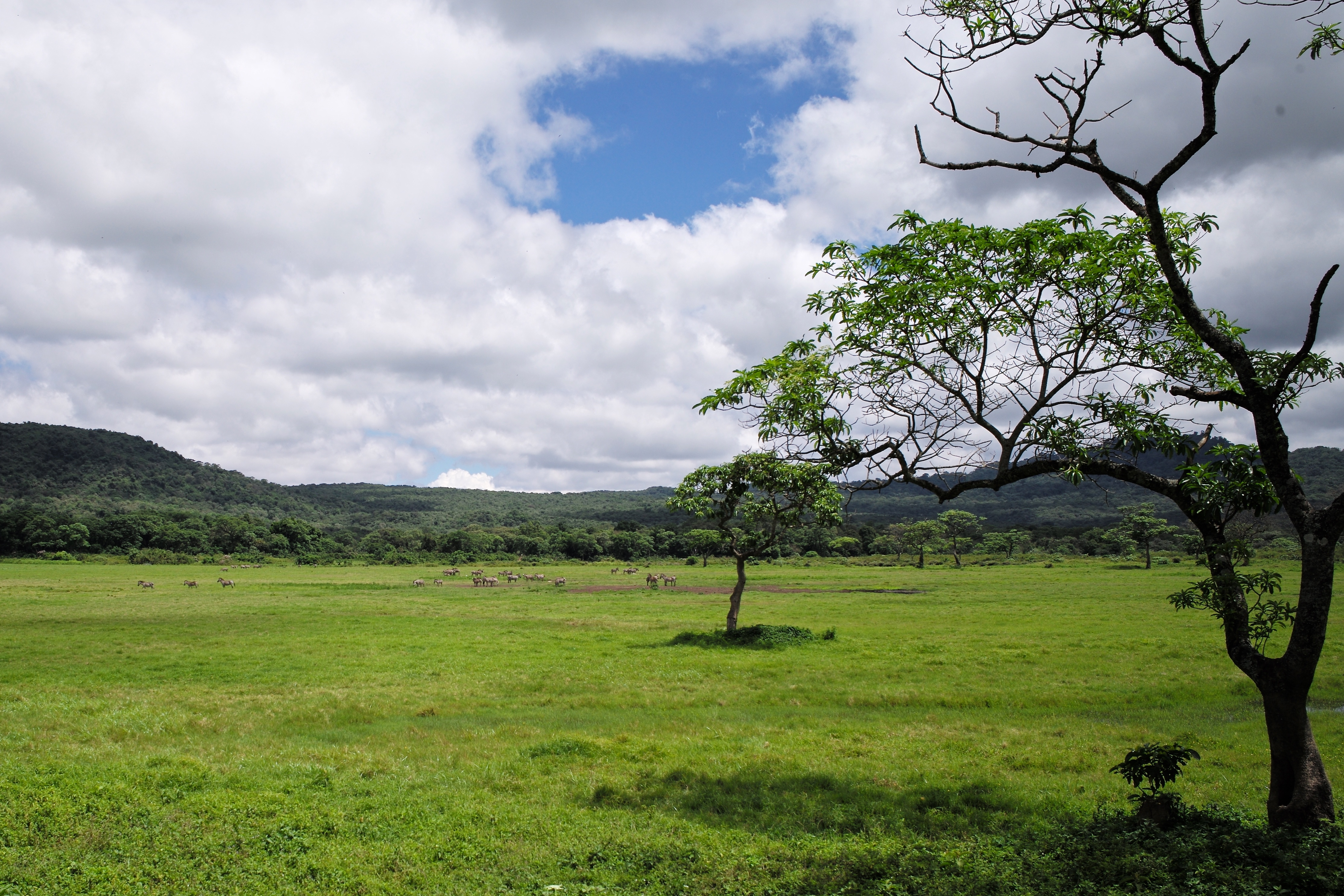
The Landscape.

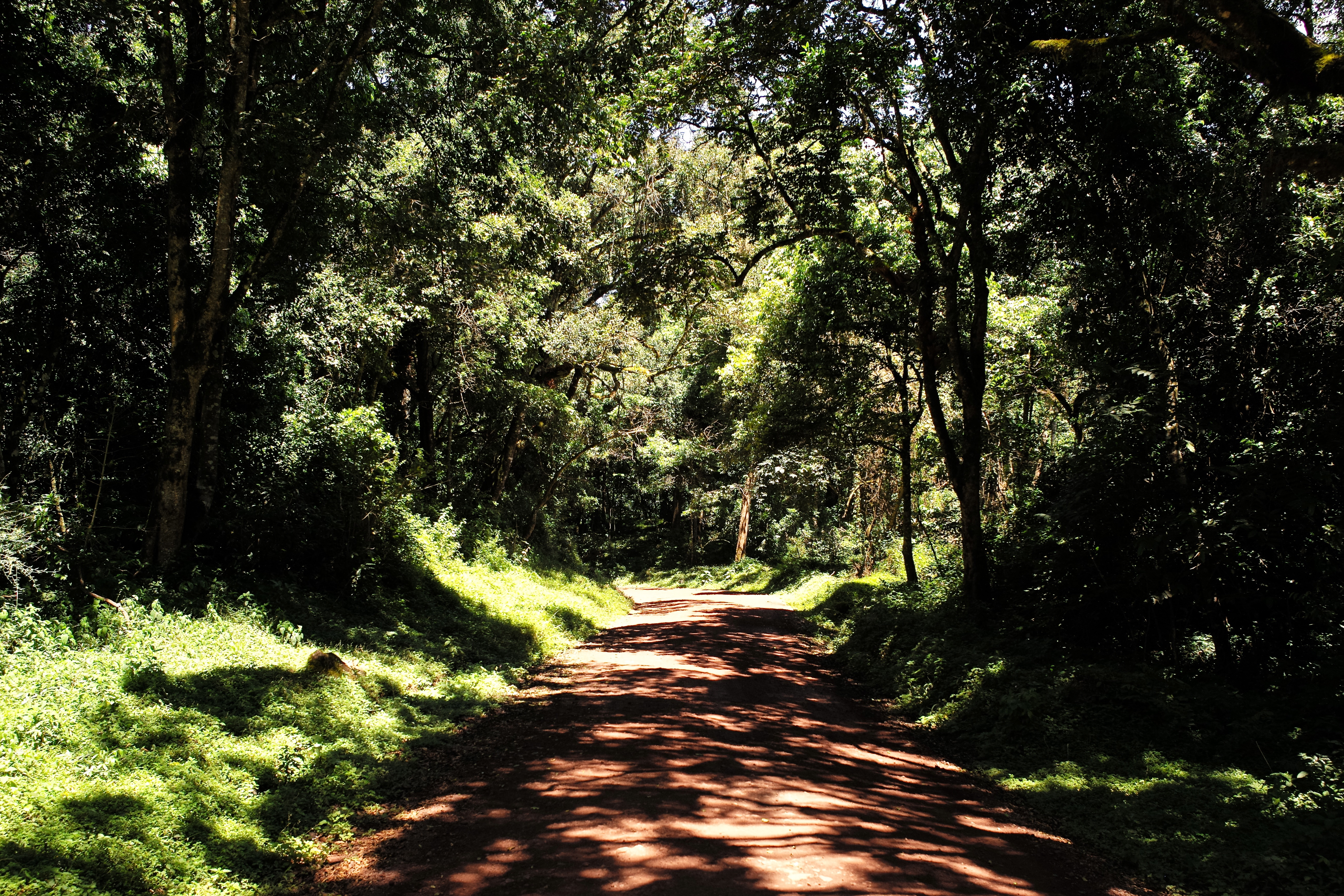
A jungle road.

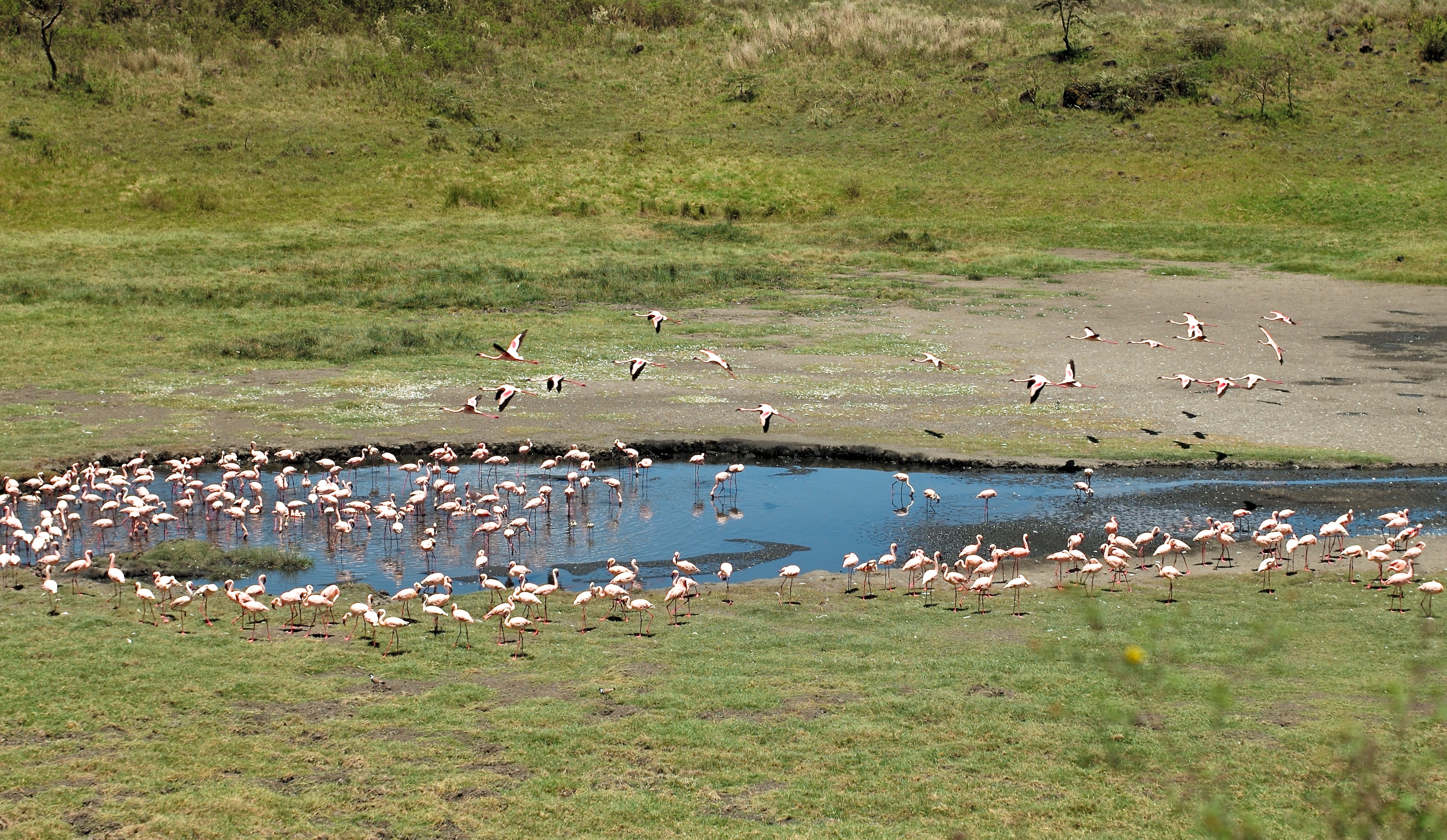
Flamingos at the Momella Lake.

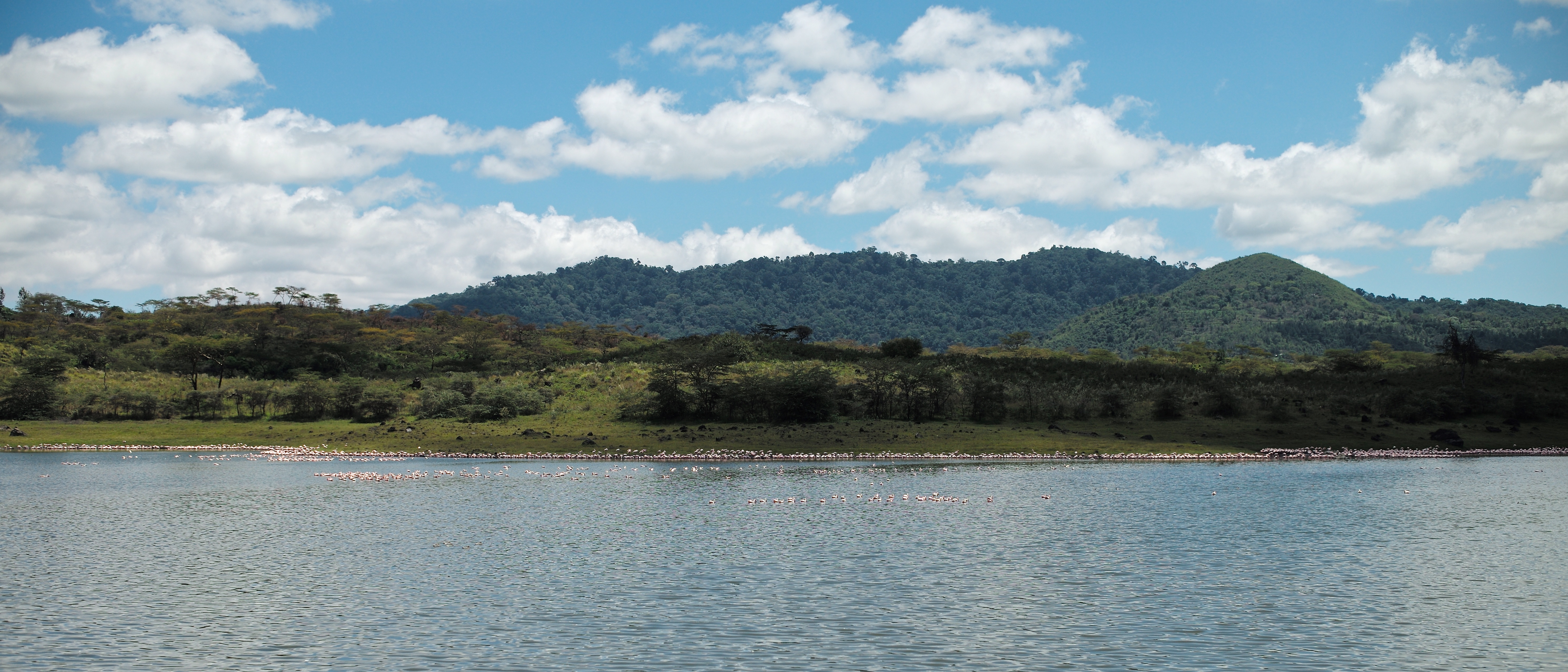
The Lake Momella

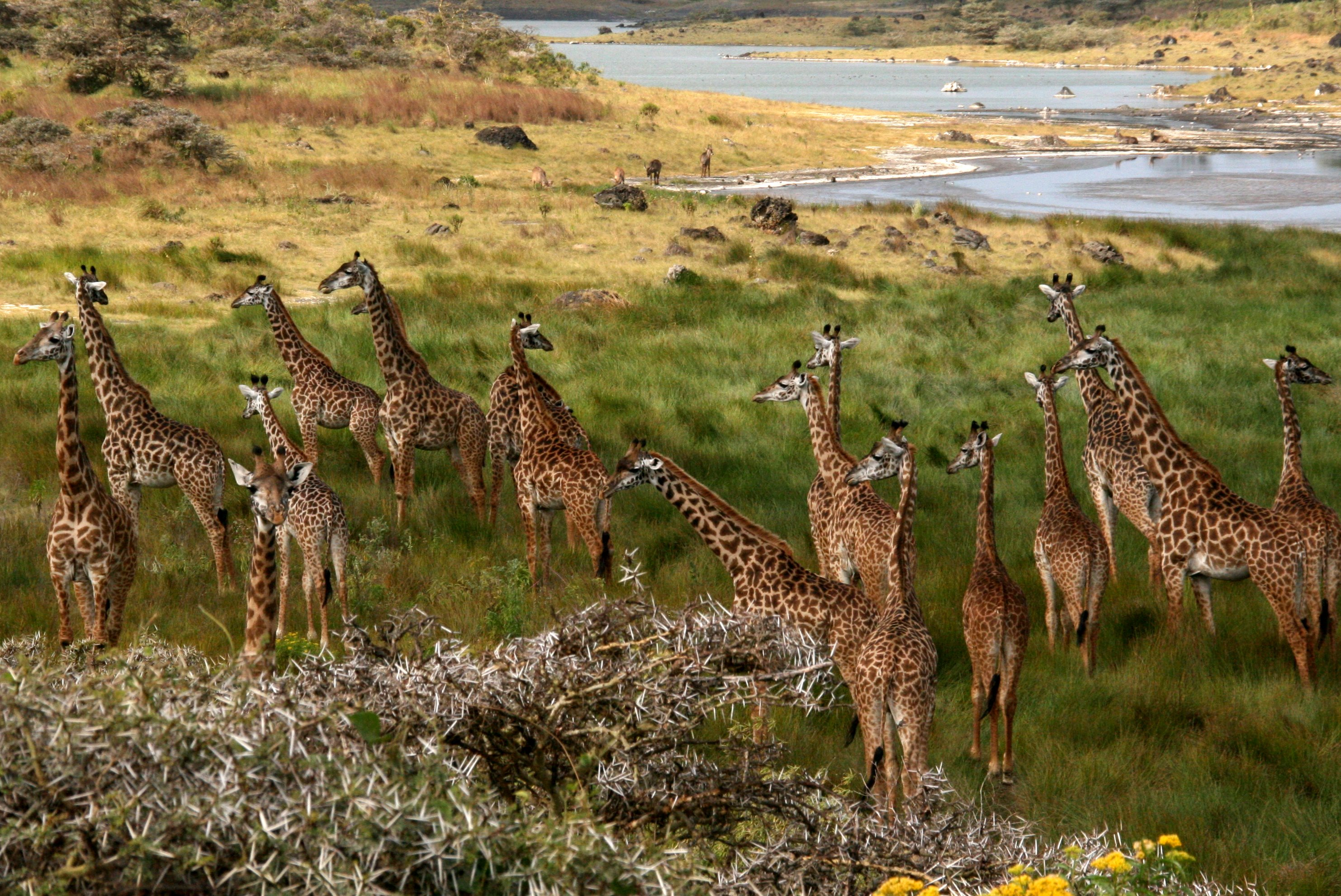
Giraffes in the Arusha National Park.

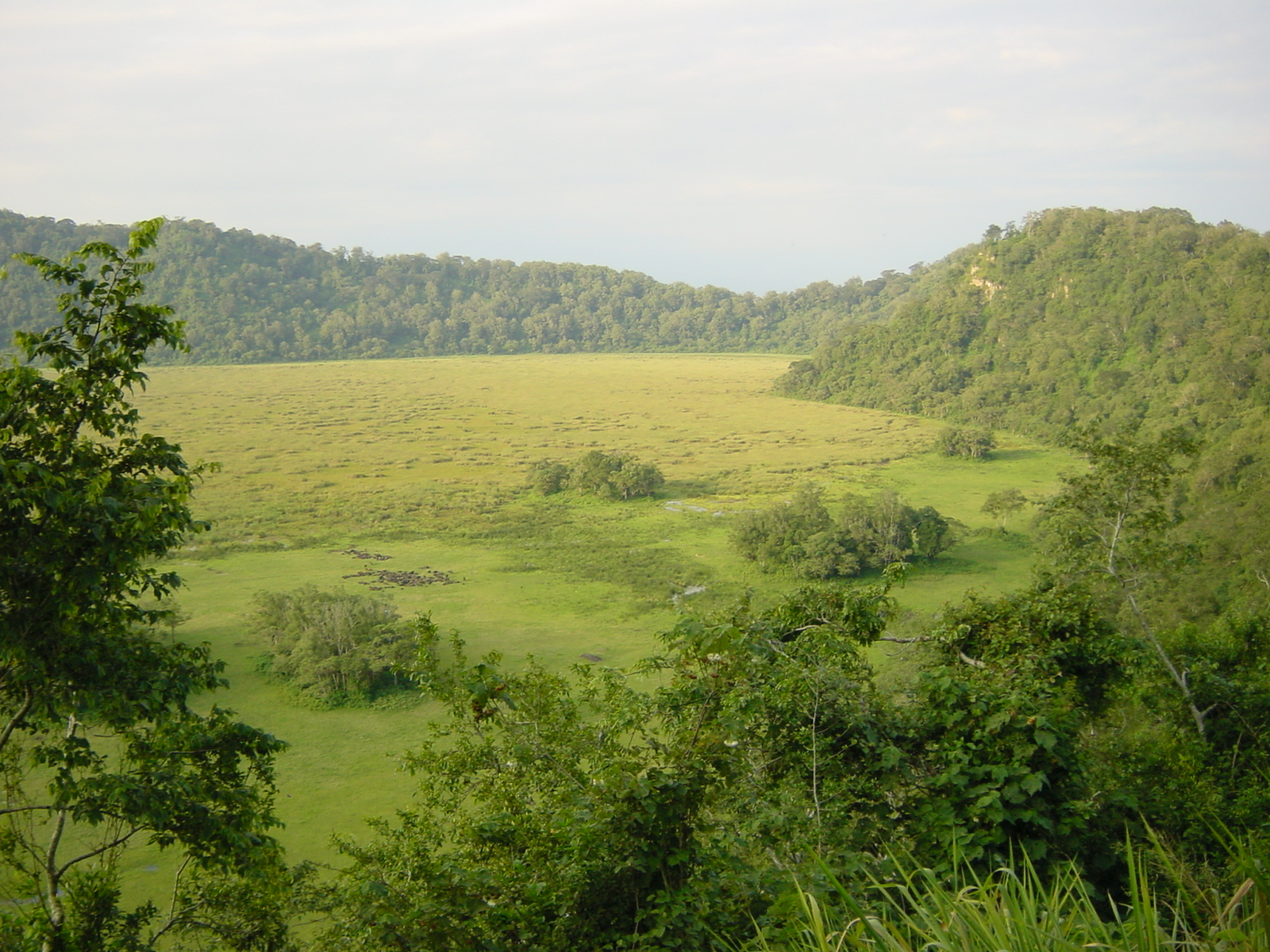
The Ngurdoto Crater.

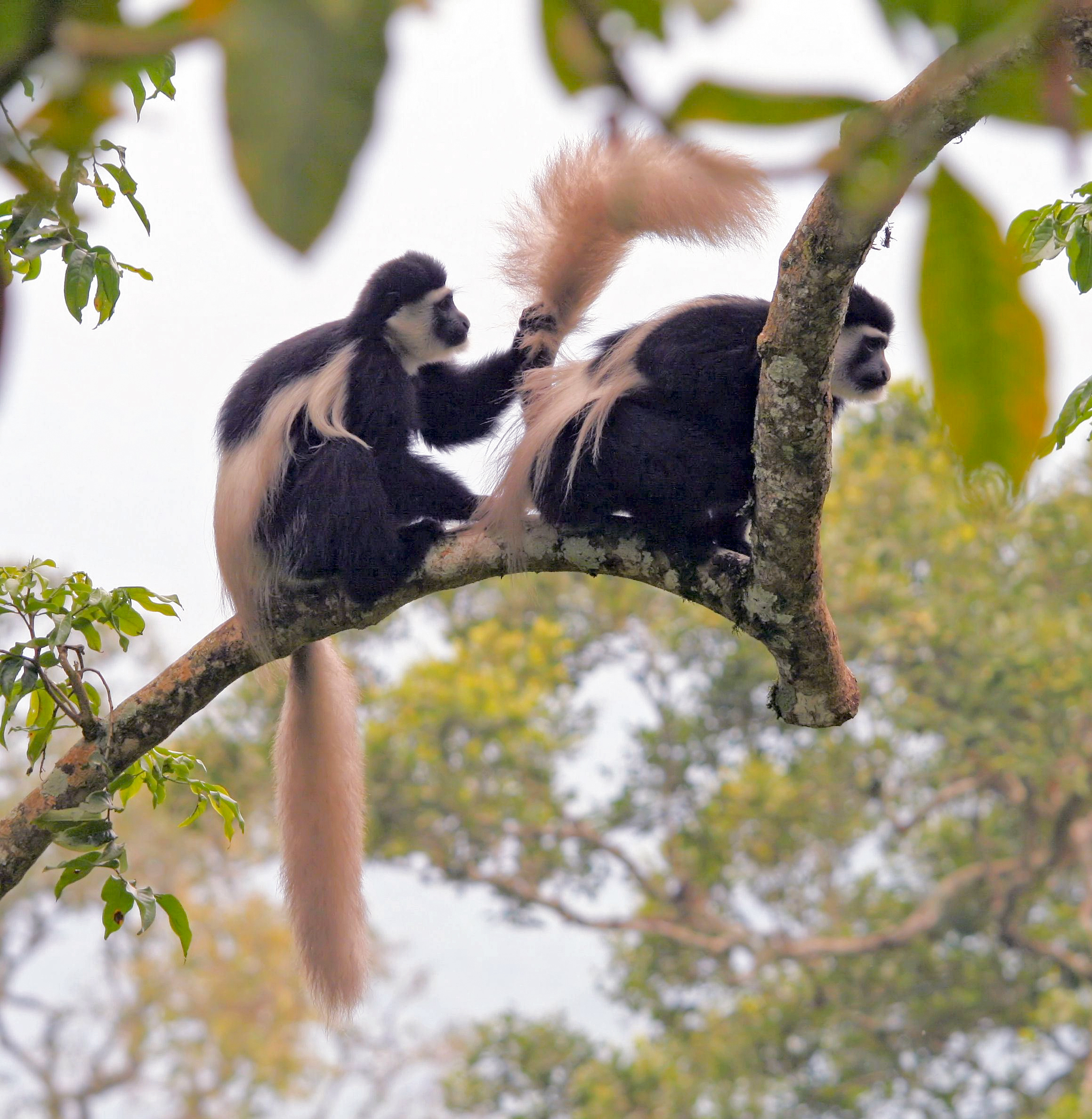
The Colobus guereza.

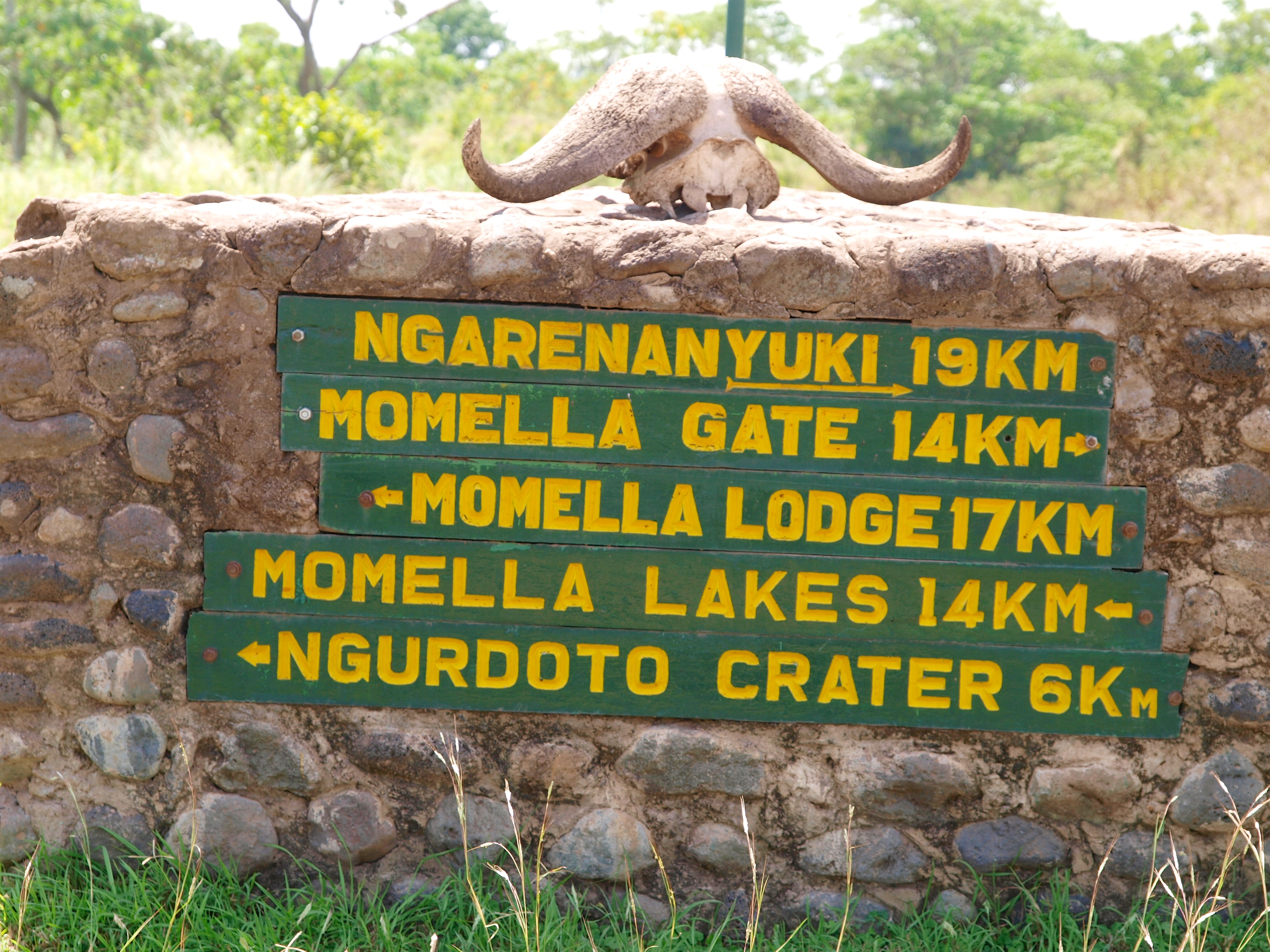
Directional sign within Arusha National Park 2015
