= Moshi, Tanzania =

Town in Tanzania

Moshi Jiji la Moshi (Swahili) Neumoschi, Swahili: موشی
- Town in Kilimanjaro Region
- Town of Moshi
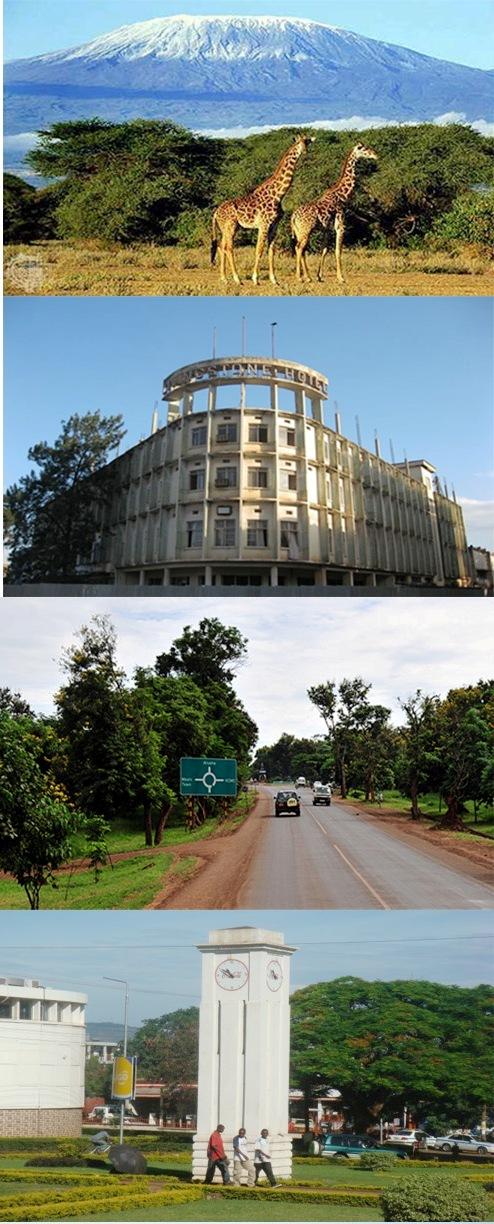
- From top: Kilimanjaro Mountain, Moshi Hotel (formerly the Livingstone Hotel), A23 Arusha-Himo road, Clock Tower

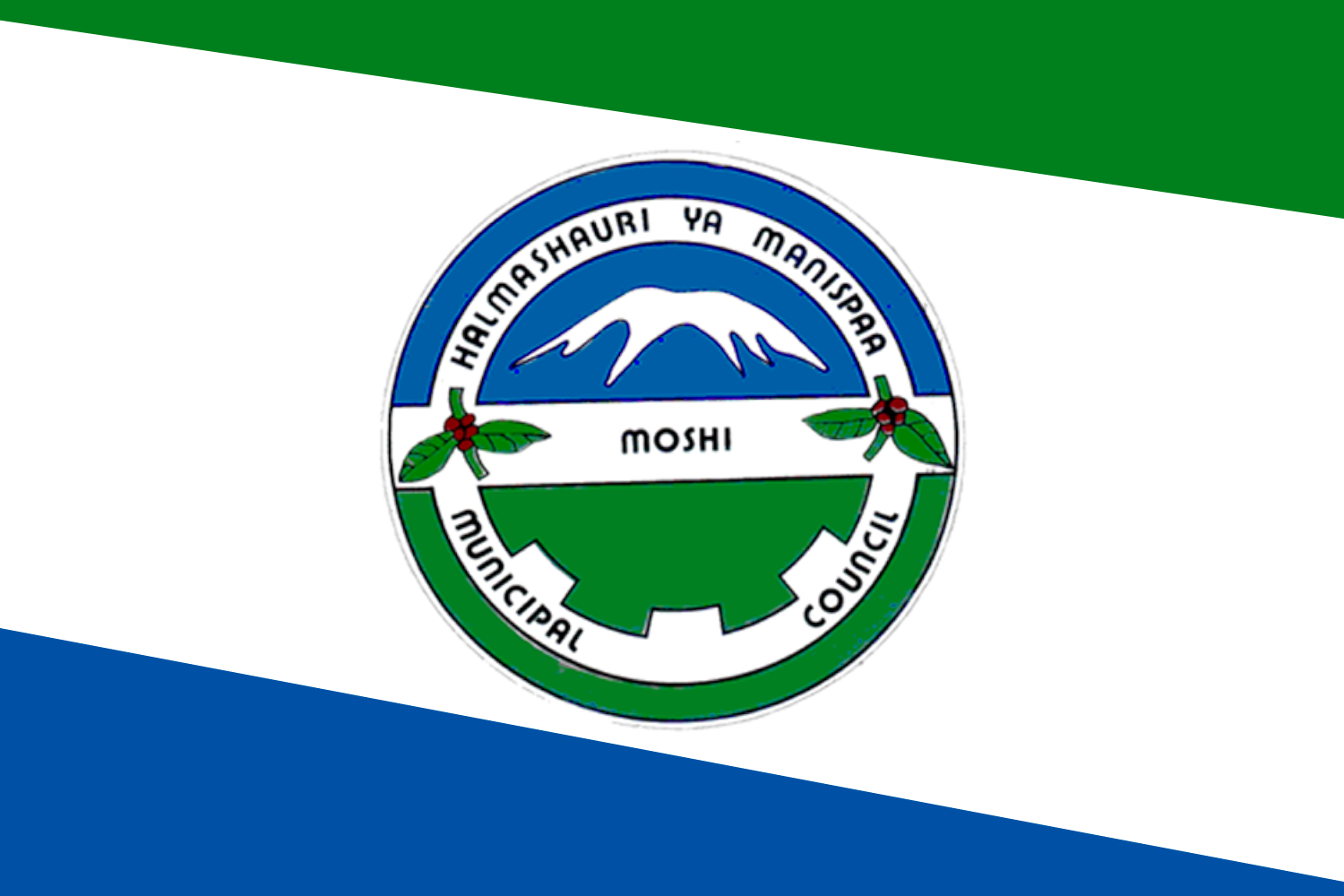
- Flag
- Nicknames: Jiji la Kahawa, Coffee City
- Location of Moshi Moshi (Africa)
- Coordinates: 3°20′05.58″S 37°20′25.37″E
- Country: Tanzania
- Region: Kilimanjaro
- Division: 21 wards: Boma Mbuzi; Bondeni; Kaloleni; Karanga; Kiborloni; Kilimanjaro; Kiusa; Korongoni; Longuo; Majengo; Mawenzi; Miembeni; Mji Mpya; Msaranga; Ngangamfumuni; Ng'ambo; Njoro; Pasua; Rau; Shirimatunda; Soweto

Government
  - Type: Municipality
  - Mayor: Zuberi Kidumo
  - Municipal Director: Rashid Gembe

Area
  - Total: 59 km^{2} (23 sq mi)
- Highest elevation: 950 m (3,120 ft)
- Lowest elevation: 700 m (2,300 ft)

Population (2017 estimates)
  - Total: 201,150
  - Density: 3,409/km^{2} (8,830/sq mi)
- Time zone: UTC+03 (East Africa Time)
- Postcode: 251
- Area code: 027
- Website: Municipal website

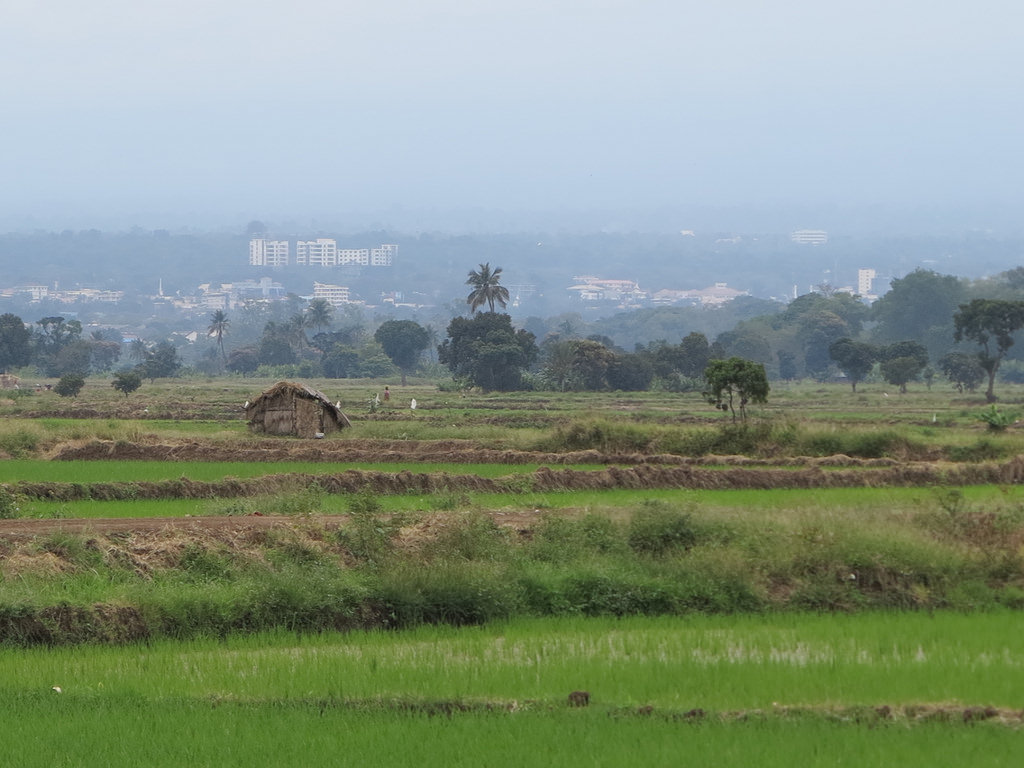
Moshi CBD as seen from Lower Moshi rice fields.

Moshi is a municipality and the capital of Kilimanjaro Region in the Northeastern Tanzania. As of 2017, the municipality has an estimated population of 201,150 and a population density of 3,409 persons per km^{2} . In the last official census of 2022, the municipality had a population of 221,733. The municipality is situated on the lower slopes of Mount Kilimanjaro, a dormant volcano that is the highest mountain in Africa. The name Moshi has been reported to refer to the smoke that emanates from the nearby mountain. The municipality covers about 59 square kilometres (23 mi^{2}) and is the smallest municipality in Tanzania by area.

== History and administration ==
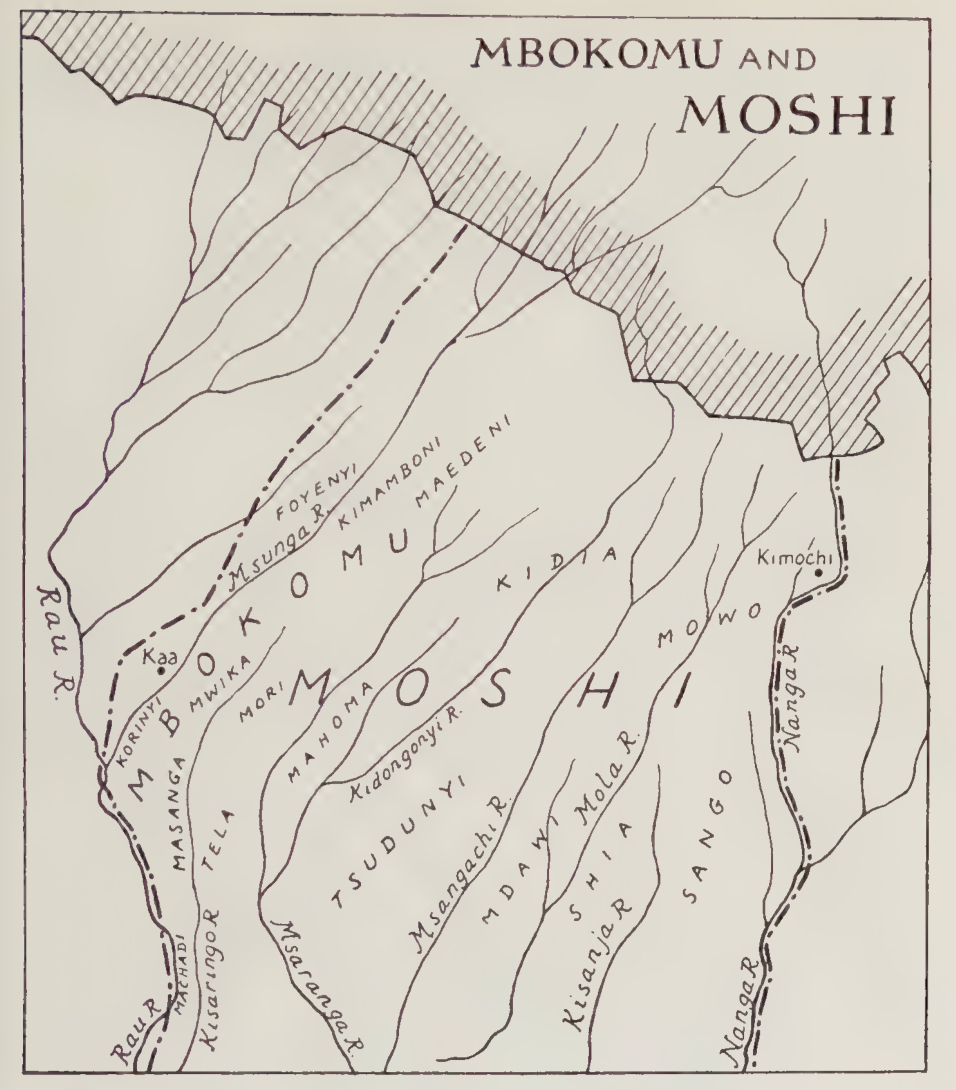
Map of Old Moshi c. 1890s

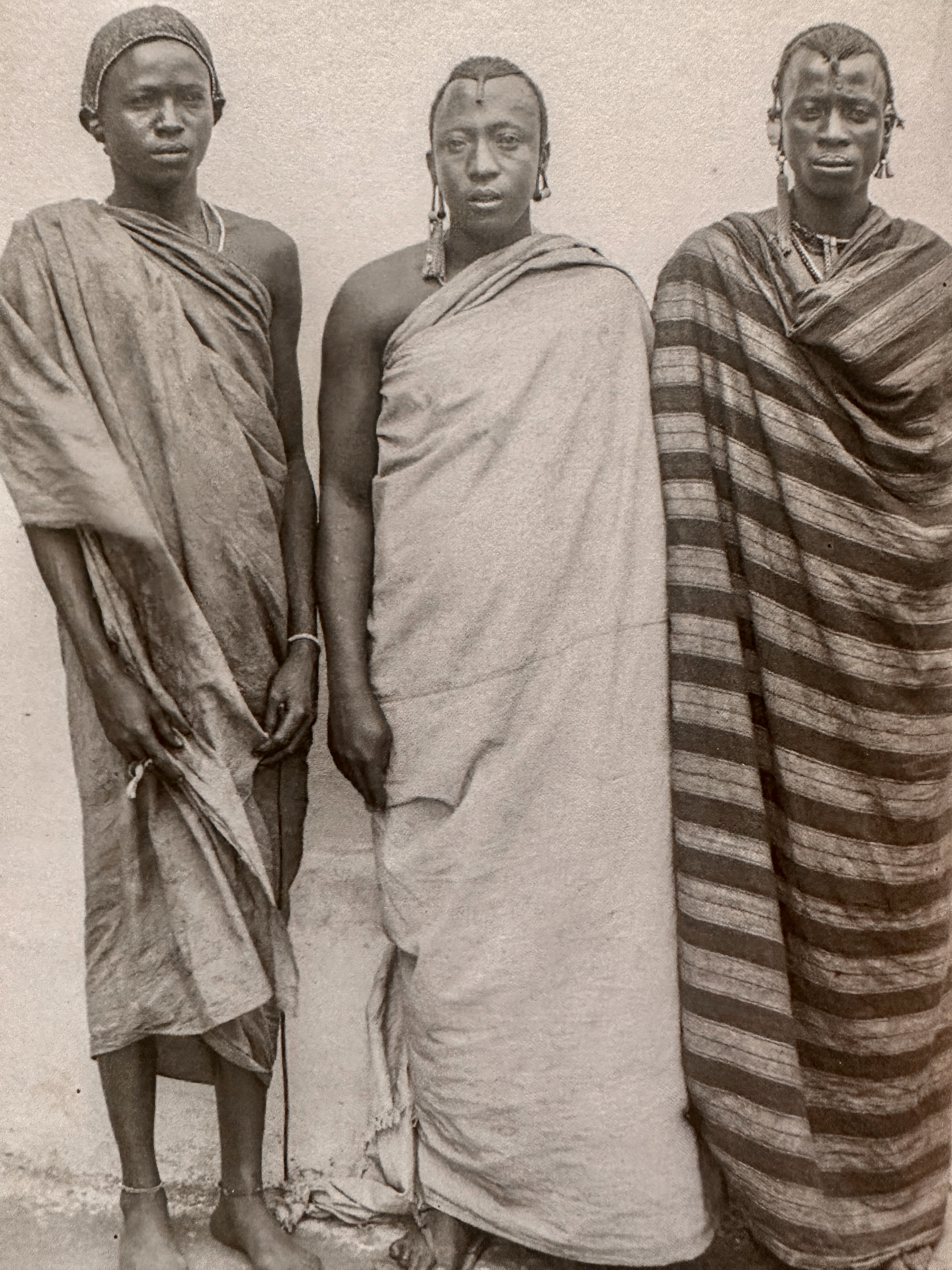
Mangi Meli and his njamaa (lineage heads), c. 1890s, at the German Moshi boma

=== Early history ===
Previously divided into nine mitaa (chiefdoms), in the mid-19th century the region was unified by Mangi Rindi of the Tarimo clan to found the Chagga state of Moshi (termed "Old Moshi"). Rindi sought protection from the expansionist mangi of Kibosho through diplomacy and the establishment of alliances. One of the avenues he took was to foster relations with the newly-arrived Europeans, and he hosted Christian missionaries and representatives of the German Empire, to whom he managed to project and maintain an oversized image as the most powerful ruler on Kilimanjaro.

In 1885, seeking to win favour with the encroaching Europeans, Rindi permitted the establishment of a Christian mission in Old Moshi and signed a treaty with the German government. However he saw his sovereignty eroded when in 1887 the German East Africa Company established a station in Old Moshi, and in 1891 when the German government extended its authority to Kilimanjaro. Rindi avoided military resistance, instead relying again on diplomacy, but while his prestige was retained, his power greatly decreased. Old Moshi became the administrative centre of German rule on Kilimanjaro. In 1891 he hosted the German army prior to their conquest of Kibosho, and died later that year.

=== Colonial and postcolonial eras ===
The German colonizers established a military camp in lower Moshi after their victory at the Battle of Moshi (against Rindi's successor, Mangi Meli) named Neumoschi in August 1892. Following the spreading of rumours by Marealle (mangi of Marangu, rival of Moshi and Kibosho) of a widespread conspiracy to expel the German administration, 19 leaders (including Meli) were executed by hanging and shooting at a tree by Meli's boma in Old Moshi. According to Father Schneider, a missionary active in East Africa during the period, by 1906 Moshi had developed into an important politico-military and commercial center. The town hosted German colonial authorities as well as Greek and Indian traders. The northern line railroad reached Moshi in 1912, and Moshi was connected to Tanga via Usambara Railway.

Beginning in the 1920s, after Tanganyika became a British mandate, Moshi experienced significant urban population growth. By 1920, the town's population had reached 3,000 inhabitants. This number increased to 29,423 by 1967 and further rose to 96,631 by 1988. In 2012, Moshi was home to 184,292 residents, and by 2017, the population had exceeded 200,000.

Moshi attained the status of a town in 1956. In 1988, it became a municipality under Tanzanian law, but as of 31 October 2014, the process for submitting its application to become a city was in its final stages. Moshi is administratively divided into 21 wards and then subdivided into 60 hamlets.

== Economy ==
As the capital of the region, it is the center of government activities, trade, finance, and tourism. In the first half of the 20th century, Moshi was traditionally an important railway town, center of banana agriculture, and commercial producer of pyrethrum.

=== Tourism ===
Moshi is one of tourism centers in the northern safari circuit of Tanzania. The closest tourism spots include Kilimanjaro National Park, Mkomazi National Park, Lake Jipe, and Lake Chala. There are also several waterfalls, natural springs, and tropical forests. Tours can also be arranged from Moshi to other areas such as Serengeti National Park, Ngorongoro Conservation Area, Arusha National Park, Lake Manyara National Park, and Tarangire National Park. The city has several hotels and recreation centers.

There is annual fair, KiliFair, organized to be an international tourism & industry fair, promoting and presenting companies based in the Kilimanjaro region. The fair has the character of a business networking event for the tourism industry, in combination with a community fair to attract local people, families & expats. Recently, Karibu Fair (TATO) and Kilifair, both well-known tourism fairs decided to join into one and create by far the largest and most important Tourism Trade Fair in East Africa. The newly formed “Karibu/KiliFair” is expecting to host 350+ exhibitors from East and Central Africa, 300+ international hosted and semi-hosted buyers, as well as approximately 4000 trade visitors during the days of the fair. The fair will annually alternate between Moshi and Arusha starting 2018 event.

- Timing: At the beginning of June every year (from 2015).
- Venue(s): Ushirika Stadium in Moshi and Friedkin Recreation Center – TGT in Arusha
- Coming Event: 2019, June 7 – 9 (to be held in Arusha)

=== Manufacturing ===
Moshi is the home to one of the three Coca-Cola bottlers in Tanzania, Bonite Botters Ltd. Serengeti Breweries, an East African Breweries company, also has a manufacturing plant in Moshi. Just south of the city, there is a sugar production facility by TPC Ltd which owns one of the largest and oldest sugar cane plantation in the country. There are several small and medium scale manufacturing facilities in dairy and food packaging sector.

=== Agriculture ===
Moshi's lower altitude and dry climate mean that the main crops grown on the higher slopes of Mount Kilimanjaro, coffee and bananas, do not thrive there. The surrounding areas in Moshi district are known for extensive farms of maize and beans, grown once per year during the long rainy season (known as "masika" in Kiswahili). In addition, the Tanganyika Planting Company operates a very large sugar cane plantation and company town 20 kilometres (12 mi) south of Moshi.

Roman Catholic missionaries introduced Arabica coffee cultivation to the Moshi region in 1893. The Kilimanjaro Native Co-operative Union was established in 1929 by the district commissioner, Charles Cecil Farquharson Dundas. Its purpose was to enable Chagga coffee growers to compete on equal terms in world markets with European growers. KNCU collects coffee from 96 village societies, representing over 150,000 small-scale farmers. KNCU handles between 50 and 70 percent of the coffee grown in the area and trades over 5,250 tons of Arabica coffee, or about 11 percent of the national production.

In recent years, efforts have been made to diversify Moshi's agricultural economy beyond traditional coffee production. In 2019, a dairy cooperative located on the eastern slopes of Mount Kilimanjaro partnered with the Poland-East Africa Economic Foundation and Polish Aid to boost dairy farming in the region. The cooperative expanded significantly, benefiting over 900 local farmers and establishing new facilities to support milk production and processing other support banana plantation which is one of key production in Moshi.

== Education ==
Like all of Tanzania, Moshi has universal primary education. According to the Tanzania Demographic and Health Survey 2010, the Kilimanjaro Region, which includes Moshi, had the second highest female literacy rate and the third highest male literacy rate among Tanzania's then-existing 26 regions. According to the Tanzania Poverty and Human Development Report 2005, the Moshi urban district had the highest literacy rate for persons over 15 years of age when compared to any of the 128 other districts in Tanzania.

Moshi hosts a number of higher education facilities, which include the Kilimanjaro Christian Medical College (KCMCo), the Stefano Moshi Memorial University College (SMMUCo), the Mwenge Catholic University (MWECAU), the Moshi Co-operative University (MoCU), the College of African Wildlife Management (CAWM), the Kilimanjaro School of Pharmacy (KSP), and the Tanzania Training Centre for Orthopaedic Technologists (TATCOT).

- KCMCo is a campus of Tumaini University. It was started in 1997 and offers a number of medical courses. The college is located within the Kilimanjaro Christian Medical Centre complex, about 6 kilometres (3.7 miles) from Moshi.
- SMMUCo is also a campus of Tumaini University. It was developed from the Masoka Management Training Institute and the Mwika Lutheran Bible College. It belongs to the Evangelical Lutheran Church in Tanzania - Northern Diocese, and it is a multi-campus university college. Currently, SMMUCo has campuses in Masoka, Mwika and Moshi, with future campuses planned for Machame, Siha, and Karatu.
- MWECAU formerly a constituent college of the Saint Augustine University of Tanzania. MWECAU is located 10 kilometres (6.2 miles) north of Moshi.
- Since May 2004, the Moshi Co-operative University has been a constituent college of the Sokoine University of Agriculture. Formerly known as the Ushirika College, it is the oldest training institution in Tanzania and is located along Sokoine Road in Moshi. Moshi Co-operative University has accumulated 43 years' experience in the fields of co-operative accounting, co-operative management and rural development has of recently turned into other expertise in accounting, management, marketing, auditing and cooperative development employed in different institutions within and outside Tanzania. Moshi Co-operative University grew from a college enrolling only 150 students, conducting tailored courses, to a university college with a capacity of 1500 students.
- CAWM is commonly known as Mweka College. It was established in 1963 following the Arusha Manifesto (1961) as a pioneer institution for the training of African wildlife managers. The majority of the CAWM's students come from the SADC region, although the College opens its doors to all students with an interest in African Wildlife Management.
- KSP is owned by the Saint Luke Foundation, a registered trust founded to provide broad spectrum services to an African population that faces serious deficiencies in pharmaceutical and health systems. KSP is currently the only pharmacy school providing competence based training for different levels of pharmaceuticals cadres to a diploma level.
- The Tanzania Training Centre for Orthopaedic Technologists (TATCOT) was founded in Moshi with the material, financial and human resource support of the governments of Tanzania and the Federal Republic of Germany in June 1981. TATCOT is a supra-regional training centre providing courses in the field of orthopaedic technology in Africa and enrols students from all English speaking African countries as well as other interested countries. The reason for establishing these courses was to educate the professionals who are required to provide technical services to people with amputations and other neuromuscular disorders such as poliomyelitis, paralysis, cerebral palsy, clubfoot and trauma. In order to do this the professionals are provided with the knowledge and skills to provide prostheses, orthoses, wheelchairs and supportive seating to people with disabilities.

Moshi also has several secondary schools. The government schools are Mawenzi Secondary School, Moshi Technical School, Moshi Secondary School, and J. K. Nyerere Secondary School. The private schools are Majengo Secondary School, Northern Highland Secondary School, United World College East Africa, and Kibo Secondary School. In addition, each ward of Moshi has a community-established secondary school, such as Rau Secondary School and Kiboriloni Secondary School.

- Mawenzi Secondary School started as the Indian School of Moshi in 1956. It is now a thriving school of 1,100 pupils. All A-Level students are female boarders and come from all over Tanzania. The school specialises at A-Level in Kiswahili, geography, history, and English. The school operates a double shift system for junior pupils (Form 1–4). All subjects are taught in English, apart from Kiswahili and French. Mawenzi School has had a link with Buckie High School in Scotland since 1987. Pupils and teachers have travelled between Tanzania and Scotland many times.
- The United World College East Africa, formerly known as the International School Moshi (ISM), was established in 1969 to serve the needs of the expatriate and local communities. The school has about 600 students from nearly 40 different nationalities on two campuses in Moshi and Arusha. The Moshi campus has about 190 students, including 90 boarders, from 25 nationalities and offers a full range of courses from early childhood to the International Baccalaureate Diploma. The school has been an International Baccalaureate World School since 1977, and was the first school to offer the IB in Africa. ISM is one of only two world schools in Tanzania to offer the primary years, middle years, and diploma programmes. In August 2019 ISM became the 18th United World College in the world, adopting the name UWC East Africa.

There are also various English medium schools with pre-primary, primary, and secondary education, such as the Eden Garden schools.

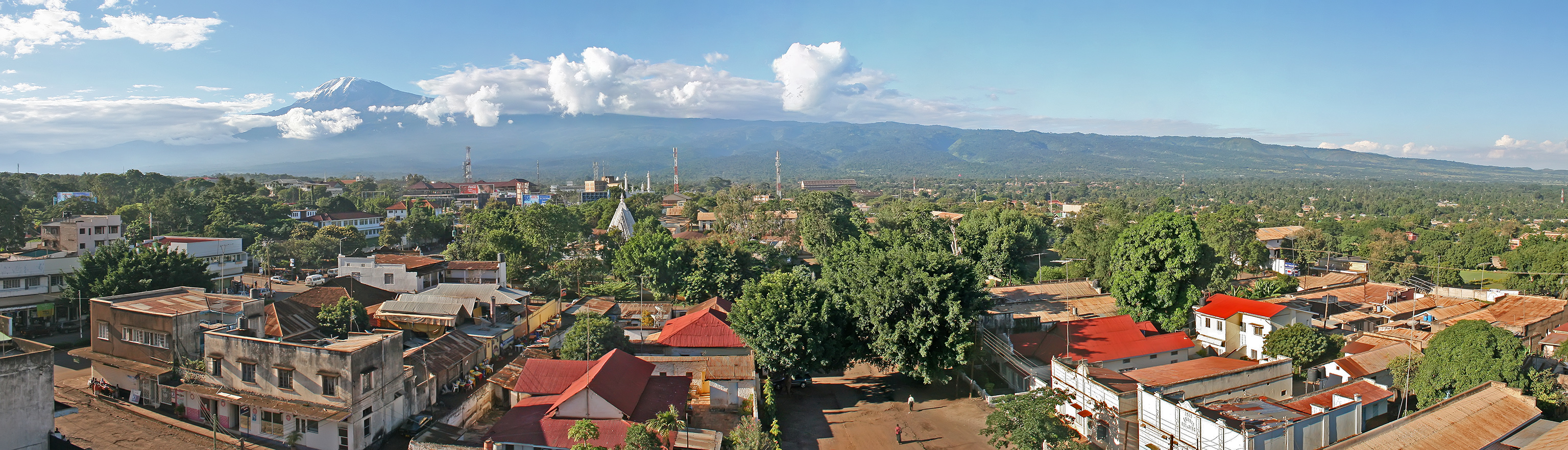
Moshi Town Panorama.

== Medical care ==
The main private hospital in the area is the Kilimanjaro Christian Medical Centre (KCMC), a zonal referral hospital. This complex has more than 450 beds and serves a population of over 11 million individuals. The Good Samaritan Foundation of Tanzania founded KCMC in March 1971.

Next to KCMC is the Kilimanjaro Centre for Community Ophthalmology (KCCO), which was founded in 2001 and is co-directed by Dr. Paul Courtright and Dr. Susan Lewallen. A new three-story building for KCCO was finished in 2007, funded by several individuals and non-governmental organizations. The KCCO is "dedicated to the elimination of avoidable blindness through programmes, training, and research focusing on the delivery of sustainable and replicable community ophthalmology services". The KCCO has an "official memorandum of understanding ... with the Department of Ophthalmology and Kilimanjaro Christian Medical College under which the KCCO assumes or shares responsibility (subject to specific funding grants) for many teaching activities, running workshops and seminars, supervising the ... [Ophthalmic Resource Centre for Eastern Africa], serving in an advisory capacity for planning Eye Department services, conducting epidemiologic and clinical research in prevention or treatment of vision loss or related fields, and serves on committees".

Moshi also hosts the Kilimanjaro Clinical Research Institute (KCRI), which is the research arm of KCMC. KCRI evolved from the Kilimanjaro Clinical Research Centre (KCRC) in 2009. KCRC was established in 2006 with the support of the Dutch government through the Netherlands-African partnership for Capacity development and Clinical interventions Against Poverty-related disease (NACCAP).

The primary public hospital in Moshi is the Mawenzi Regional Referral Hospital, which started sometime before 1920 as a small dispensary for German soldiers and became a hospital in 1956. The hospital has about 300 beds but is severely underfunded. In late 2010, its surgical services were suspended indefinitely by the Government and Private Hospitals Inspection Committee of the Tanzanian Ministry of Health and Social Welfare. The head of the committee, Dr. Pamella Sawa, said, "During our inspection, we inspected the theatre room of Mawenzi Hospital and found it very dirty, with no[t] enough ventilation, the situation which is dangerous not only to the patient but also to his/her attendant...." The hospital includes a Care and Treatment Centre for people living with HIV/AIDS. The hospital's physical therapy department has a student learning program in cooperation with Norway, in which Norwegian physiotherapy students in their second and third years come as short term apprentices.

== Transportation ==
=== Roads ===
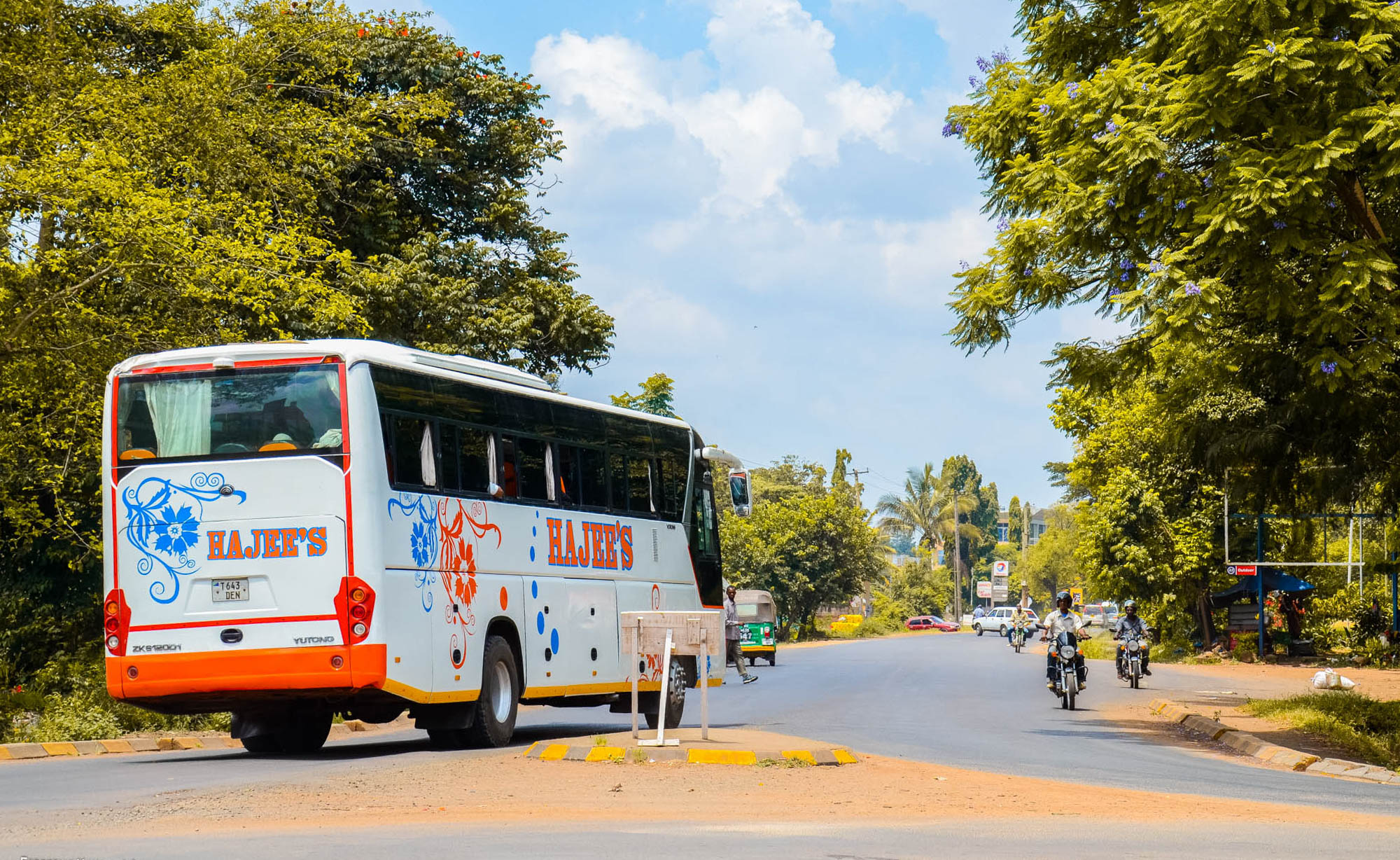
Bus in Moshi.

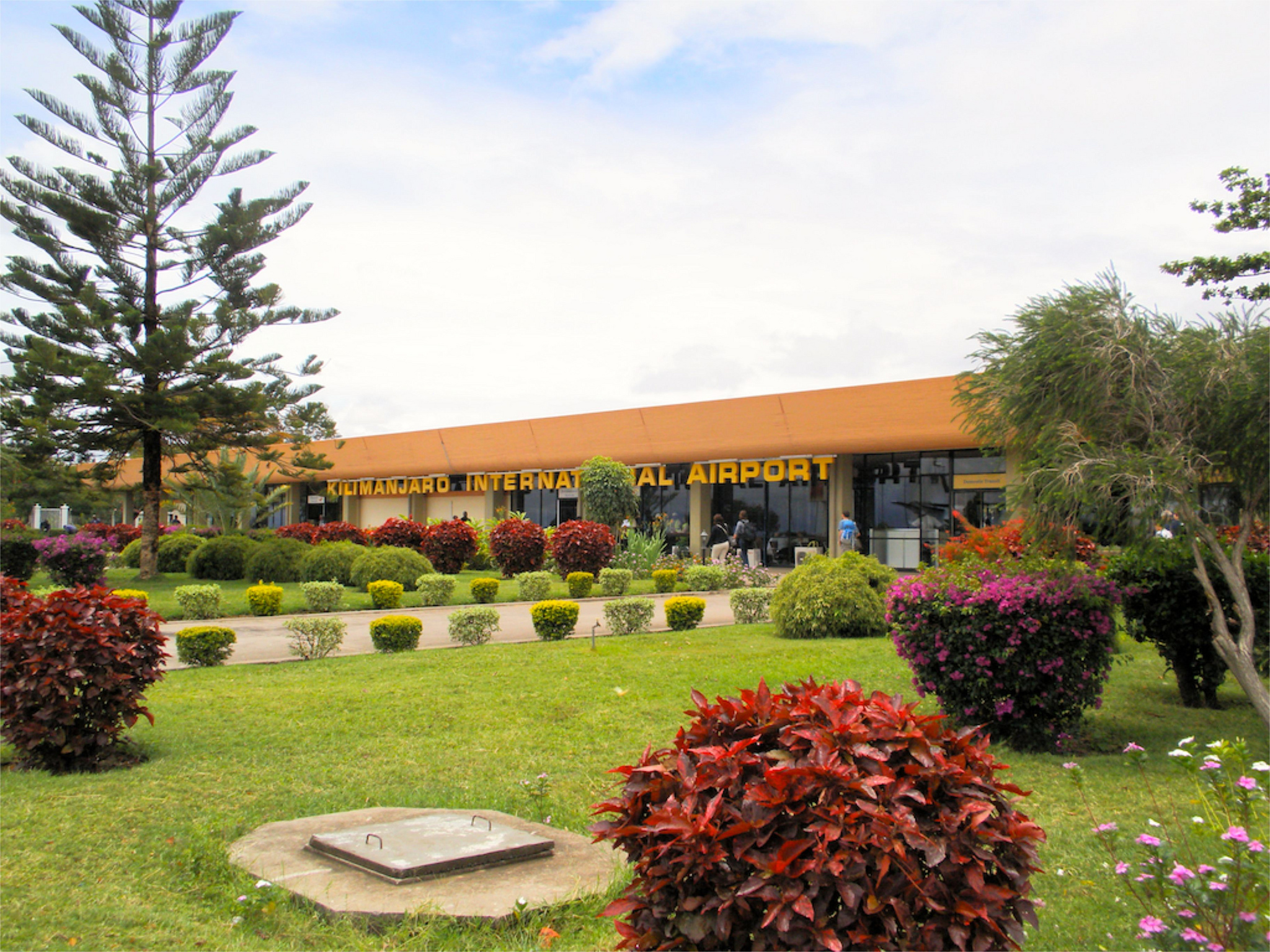
Kilimanjaro International Airport.

Moshi is connected to other cities in Tanzania by Tanroads highway T2. Several bus companies operate intercity routes from Moshi. There are also local buses for the intracity travel.

=== Air ===
Kilimanjaro International Airport, which is operated by the Kilimanjaro Airport Development Company and located in Hai District approximately 40 km along the Moshi-Arusha Highway. There is also a small airport nearby (Moshi Airport) approximately 5 km from the city center. The airport serves mostly chartered and private flights.

=== Rail ===
Tanga Line passes through Moshi. The line carries cargo mostly cement from Tanga to Moshi and Arusha. There is regular passenger service to Arusha and Dar Es Salaam.

== Sports and events ==
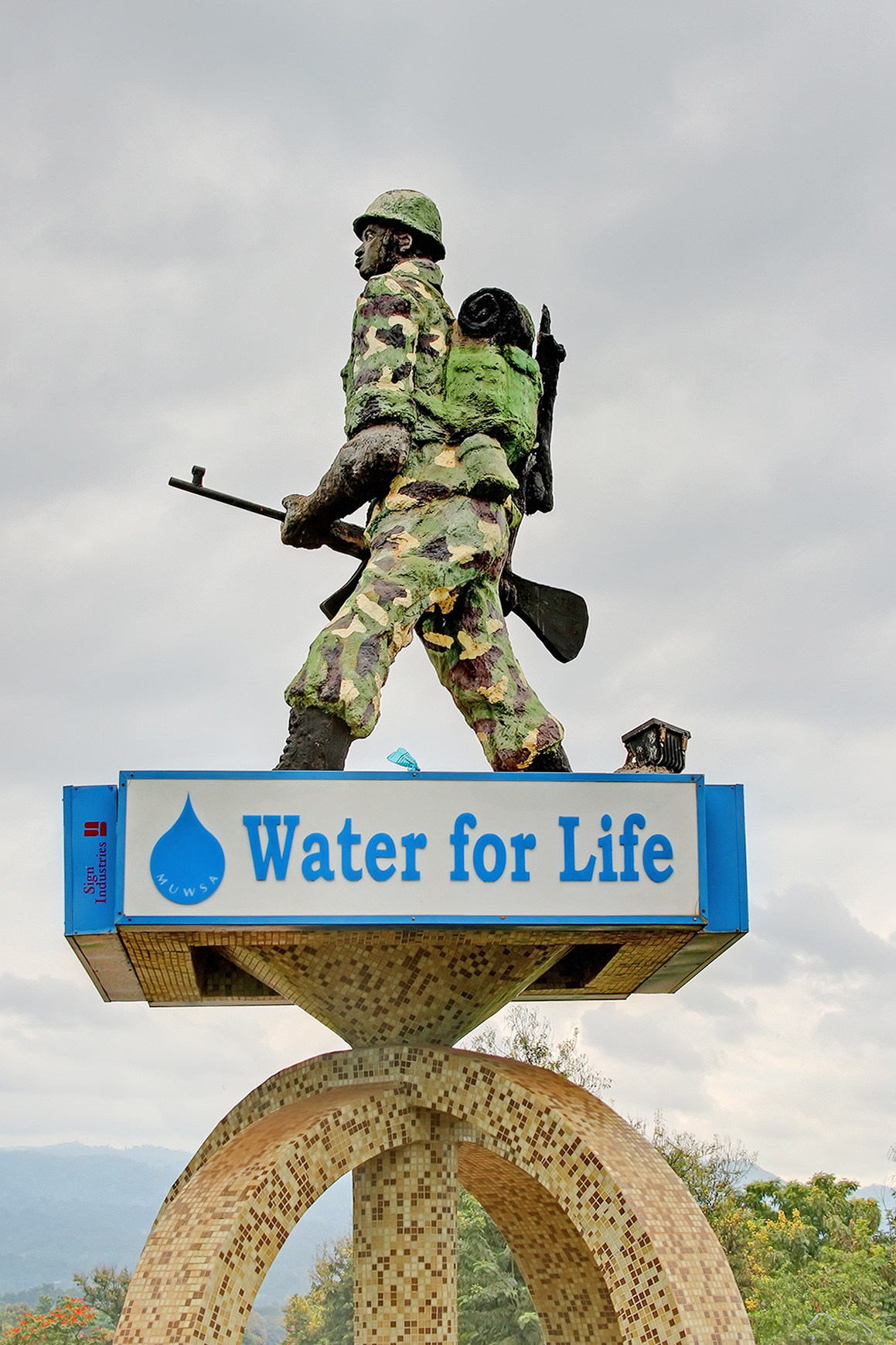
The Askari monument in Moshi.

=== Running races ===
Moshi hosts the Kilimanjaro Marathon, Tanzania's largest sport event, held annually at the end of February or beginning of March since 2002. The race is a member of the Association of International Marathons and Distance Races. Apart from promoting tourism, the race promotes the sport in Tanzania and has the official backing of the Tanzania Tourist Board, Athletics Tanzania, and the International Association of Athletics Federations.

In 2015, 313 persons finished the 42.2 kilometres (26.2 mi) full marathon, and 2,593 persons finished the 21.1 kilometres (13.1 mi) half marathon. The race also includes a 5 kilometer (3.1 mile) fun run.

=== Hockey ===
Moshi has one field hockey pitch, formerly known as Sikh Club and it is home to well known hockey teams from Moshi like Moshi Khalsa and Kili Vijana. Hockey is an active sport in Moshi and it holds tournaments as well such as the annual Nyerere Cup hosted by the Sikh Community.

=== Football ===
Moshi has several football pitches where players from different ethnicities and backgrounds come together to enjoy the sport. The Ushirika Stadium is the only full - sized pitch where many official league matches have been played including the Tanzanian Premier League. Other pitches include the Hindu Mandal ground and the Moshi Club.

=== Golf ===
Moshi has two golf courses, Moshi Golf Course operated by Moshi Gymkhana Club (MGC) and TPC Moshi Golf Course operated by TPC Club. The clubs host various national and regional events, annually, coordinated by the Tanzania Golf Union.

== Climate ==
Moshi has a tropical wet and dry climate. Its weather is dominated year round by monsoonal flow. The northeast monsoon prevails December through March and is accompanied by the highest temperatures of the year. The southeast monsoon prevails from June through September. Unique among the world's monsoons, both monsoons in Tanzania are divergent in the low levels, shallow (averaging only 2 kilometres or 1.2 miles in depth), and capped by inversion and dry, subsiding air. These factors result in light or insignificant rainfall year-round except during the transitional periods between the monsoons.

Moshi's altitude keeps temperatures lower than surrounding cities, even without the maritime effects that a coastal city enjoys. Nighttime temperatures are relatively consistent throughout the year, averaging from 15 to 17 degrees Celsius. Moshi has noticeably warmer daytime temperatures from October through March, when average high temperatures exceed 30 degrees Celsius, and noticeably cooler daytime temperatures from May through August, when average high temperatures are 25 to 26 degrees Celsius.

Moshi's wettest months are March through May, when around 71 percent of its annual rainfall occurs.

Climate data for Moshi (Kilimanjaro Airport), elevation 891 m (2,923 ft), (1991–2020)
Month	Jan	Feb	Mar	Apr	May	Jun	Jul	Aug	Sep	Oct	Nov	Dec	Year
Record high °C (°F)	37.2 (99.0)	37.8 (100.0)	37.9 (100.2)	35.6 (96.1)	32.2 (90.0)	30.2 (86.4)	29.4 (84.9)	32.9 (91.2)	33.9 (93.0)	36.4 (97.5)	36.5 (97.7)	36.2 (97.2)	37.9 (100.2)
Mean daily maximum °C (°F)	33.1 (91.6)	33.7 (92.7)	32.8 (91.0)	29.8 (85.6)	27.4 (81.3)	26.4 (79.5)	26.2 (79.2)	27.4 (81.3)	29.6 (85.3)	31.3 (88.3)	31.9 (89.4)	32.3 (90.1)	30.2 (86.3)
Mean daily minimum °C (°F)	18.9 (66.0)	19.0 (66.2)	19.9 (67.8)	20.0 (68.0)	18.7 (65.7)	16.3 (61.3)	15.1 (59.2)	15.4 (59.7)	16.0 (60.8)	17.6 (63.7)	19.1 (66.4)	19.1 (66.4)	17.9 (64.3)
Record low °C (°F)	11.6 (52.9)	11.9 (53.4)	10.9 (51.6)	12.9 (55.2)	11.7 (53.1)	10.4 (50.7)	8.6 (47.5)	9.4 (48.9)	10.1 (50.2)	11.1 (52.0)	11.6 (52.9)	13.0 (55.4)	8.6 (47.5)
Average precipitation mm (inches)	43.3 (1.70)	38.9 (1.53)	93.5 (3.68)	131.5 (5.18)	73.2 (2.88)	9.1 (0.36)	3.5 (0.14)	6.1 (0.24)	4.7 (0.19)	24.5 (0.96)	51.1 (2.01)	44.5 (1.75)	523.9 (20.62)
Average precipitation days (≥ 1.0 mm)	3.8	3.2	6.3	11.6	9.1	2.0	1.0	0.8	0.7	3.2	4.6	4.3	50.6
Average relative humidity (%)	61.1	60.3	65.3	75.4	77.8	73.1	68.4	64.7	61.9	61.9	65.1	63.7	66.6
Source 1: NOAA
Source 2: IEM (humidity 2011–2024) JICA (extremes)

== Politics ==
Moshi has been the base of opposition politics since the struggle for independence.

The last Mangi Mkuu (Paramount Chief) of the Chagga, Thomas Lenana Marealle II, whose palace was located in Moshi, worked for the independence of Tanganyika when it was still a United Nations trust territory under British administration. In his speech to the United Nations Trusteeship Council on 17 June 1957, he said that Tanganyika could become self-governing within ten to fifteen years. This speech occurred one day before Julius Nyerere addressed the same body.

In 2010, the unsuccessful Chadema presidential candidate, Willibrod Slaa, received 55.6 percent of the popular vote in the Moshi Urban District compared to 43.5 percent for the nationwide winner, Jakaya Mrisho Kikwete of the Chama cha Mapinduzi party.

In 2010, the Chadema parliamentary candidate, Philemon Kiwelu Ndesamburo, was elected to office with 62.3 percent of the vote.

As of May 2012, six of the seven special seats on the Moshi Municipal Council are held by Chadema party members.

== In literature ==
In 1953, journalist John Gunther described Moshi as "the kind of town Somerset Maugham, if he ever wrote about Africa, might have invented."

== See also ==
- Railway stations in Tanzania
- Chaga people
- Pare people
