= Soweto (disambiguation) =

Soweto is a township of Johannesburg, Gauteng, South Africa.

Soweto may also refer to:

== Music ==
- Soweto (album) a 1979 album by Billy Higgins
- "Soweto" (song), a 2022 song by Victony
- Upper West Side Soweto, the style of Vampire Weekend on their debut album

== People ==
- Samthing Soweto (Lelethu Mdolomba, born 1988), South African singer and songwriter
- Soweto Kinch (born 1978), British jazz saxophonist and rapper

== Places ==
- Soweto, Moshi Mjini, an administrative ward in Kilimanjaro Region, Tanzania
- Soweto (Namibia), now John Pandeni, a constituency in Khomas Region, Namibia
- Saweto, Peru or Saweto, a village in the Peruvian Amazon

== Other uses ==
- Soweto Highway, a section of the M70 road in Johannesburg
