= Rakesh Rajani =

Tanzanian civil society leader

Rakesh Rajani રાકેશ રજની
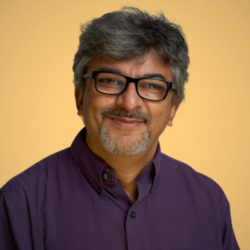
- Born: c. 1966 (age 59–60); Mwanza, Tanzania
- Education: International School Moshi
- Alma mater: Brandeis University (B.A.); Harvard University (M.T.S.)
- Occupations: Exec. Dir., HakiElimu (2001-07); Head, Twaweza (2009-14); Director, Ford Foundation (2015–2018); Vice President, Co-Impact (2018–2023); President, Just Systems (2023–Present)
- Spouse: Margaret Bangser
- Children: Amar and Chhaya
- Parent(s): Rasiklal and Indira Rajani

Rakesh Rajani (born in 1966) is a Tanzanian civil society leader. Rajani has established and led key social initiatives in the evolution of education in Tanzania and East Africa since 1991. He has founded Haki Elimu, and advocated for young people through education, as well as with open government, ICT, and the organizations Twaweza, and Uwezo. Rajani is known for his expertise in the field for International Development work, particularly related to child rights, education, democracy, and open government in East Africa.

== Life and career ==
Rajani was born in Tanzania in circa 1966 where he completed his primary and secondary education, graduating from the International School Moshi in 1985. He was then awarded the Wien Scholarship and began his university studies in the United States. In 1989, he graduated from Brandeis University with a BA in Philosophy and English Literature and in 1991 he graduated from Harvard University with an MTS in Theology. While studying at Brandeis and Harvard, Rajani was part of the Catholic Worker movement at Haley House in Boston, Massachusetts.

From 1991 to 1998 Rajani co-founded and served as the first executive director of the Kuleana Centre for Children's Rights in his hometown of Mwanza, Tanzania. The organization worked with "street children" and advocated for children's interests across the country. This work concluded that a lack of rights caused the deprivation of these children. It received the Maurice Pate Award but is now largely defunct.

After Kuleana, Rajani served as a resident fellow at Harvard University's Center for Population and Development Studies and the Human Rights Program of the Harvard Law School from 1998 to 2000. He continued as a non-resident fellow for many years and served as an associate of the Joint Learning Initiative on Children and HIV/AIDS from 2006 to 2009.

In 2001, Rajani founded Haki Elimu and served as its executive director. Early on, the organization offered advice on the primary education and secondary education development plans (PEDP and SEDP) that led to the expansion of government primary and secondary schooling in Tanzania throughout the 2000-2010 decade. Rajani also co-edited two volumes of speeches and papers on education by Julius Nyerere, Tanzania's founding president. Rajani stepped down as executive director at the end of 2007 but continued some work with the organization through its Board until 2009.

After leaving HakiElimu, in 2008 and 2009 Rajani worked as a consultant with Hivos, William and Flora Hewlett Foundation, Google.org, and other agencies. His main work involved researching and advising on strengthening citizen driven accountability in East Africa. This work led to the formation of Twaweza in 2009, a program to promote access to information, citizen agency and better service delivery in Tanzania, Kenya and Uganda. Through this Rajani played a key role in helping set up the Open Government Partnership, where he served as the civil society chairman for two years. One of Twaweza's major projects is Uwezo, which undertakes a large-scale assessment of basic literacy and numeracy in Kenya, Uganda and Tanzania regularly. The World Bank Development Report in 2018 was anchored in the main finding of this work. Another major program of the work started under Rajani's leadership is Africa's first nationally representative mobile phone survey, known as Sauti ya Wananchi (Citizen's Voices) which regularly collects and publishes independent and scientifically credible data.

Rajani stepped down from Twaweza in December 2014 and became director of the Democratic Participation and Governance program at the Ford Foundation in New York, USA in January 2015, charged with strengthening the organization's global engagement. From 2014 until 2015, Rajani served on United Nations Secretary-General Ban Ki-moon's Independent Expert Advisory Group on the Data Revolution for Sustainable Development, co-chaired by Enrico Giovannini and Robin Li.

== Personal life ==
Rajani married in 1998 and has two children, Amar and Chhaya. Rajani was born into a Hindu family and converted to Christianity. He lives with his family in the United States and Tanzania.

== Publications ==
- WorldCat search (21 Book listings, authored or coauthored by Rakesh Rajani)
- Co-author, A “Socio Economic” Policy Case Study in Tanzania, Joint Learning Initiative on Children and HIV/AIDS (2008)
- Are our Children Learning? a report assessing literacy and numeracy in Tanzania by Uwezo in 2010; other similar reports can be found on http://www.uwezo.net
- Whose Business is Development? Experts in an Open Society
- /12%20Public%20Accountability%20-%20Capacity%20is%20Political%20Not%20Technical%20-%20Rakesh%20Rajani%20-%20Capacity%20development%20in%20Practice%20chapter%2012%5B1%5D.pdf book chapter Capacity is Political, Not Technical
- Can Your Child Read and Count? Measuring Learning Outcomes in East Africa
- The Participation Rights of Adolescents, a paper for UNICEF, 2011
