= William Howlet =

William Howlet may refer to:

- William Howlett (born 1946), Irish expert on neurological diseases in Africa
- William Hewlet or Howlet (fl.1630s–1660), convicted of executing Charles I of England in 1649 but reprieved
