= SMMU =

SMMU may refer to:

- Second Military Medical University, China
- System Memory Management Unit, an IOMMU by ARM
- Smack My Marine Up, in the List of Doom source ports
- PIMCO Short Term Muni Bond Strategy ETF (NYSE Arca code: SMMU); See List of American exchange-traded funds
- SMMU, a force of the Austrian Armed Forces

== See also ==
- Santa Monica-Malibu Unified School District (SMMUSD), US
- Stefano Moshi Memorial University College (SMMUCo), Tanzania
