= Moshi Urban District =

District of Kilimanjaro Region, Tanzania

Moshi Wilaya ya Moshi (Swahili)
- District
- Wilaya ya Moshi, Mkoa wa Kilimanjaro
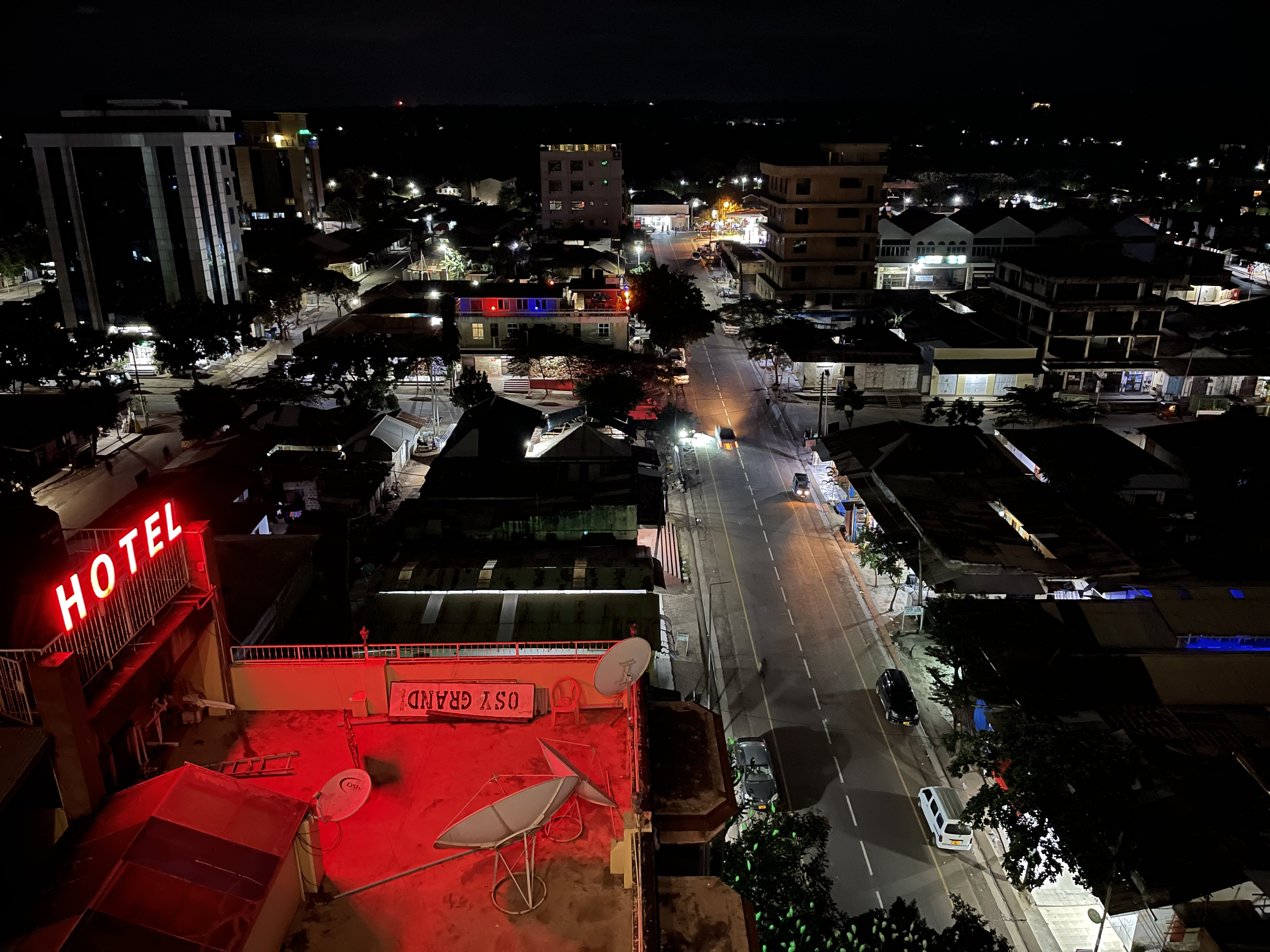
- Street scene in Kiusa Ward, Moshi
- Nickname: The Heart of Kilimanjaro
- Moshi Municipal in Kilimanjaro Region 2022
- Coordinates: 3°20′34.8″S 37°21′2.52″E
- Country: Tanzania
- Region: Kilimanjaro Region
- District: 1988
- Capital: Moshi

Area
  - Total: 63.39 km^{2} (24.48 sq mi)
- Highest elevation (Karanga): 896 m (2,940 ft)

Population (2022 census)
  - Total: 221,733
  - Density: 3,498/km^{2} (9,060/sq mi)
- Demonym: City Moshian

Ethnic groups
  - Settler: Swahili
  - Native: Chaga
- Tanzanian Postal Code: 25-1
- Website: District website

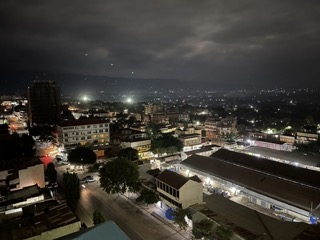
View of Bondeni Ward, Moshi

Moshi Urban District (officially known as Moshi City Council) is an administrative district located in Kilimanjaro Region of Tanzania. The district is home to regional capital of Kilimanjaro Region, namely Moshi. The district covers an area of 63.39 km^{2} (24.48 sq mi). The district is surrounded on the west by Moshi Rural District, to the east by the Hai District. According to the 2022 Tanzania National Census, the population of Moshi Urban District was 221,733.

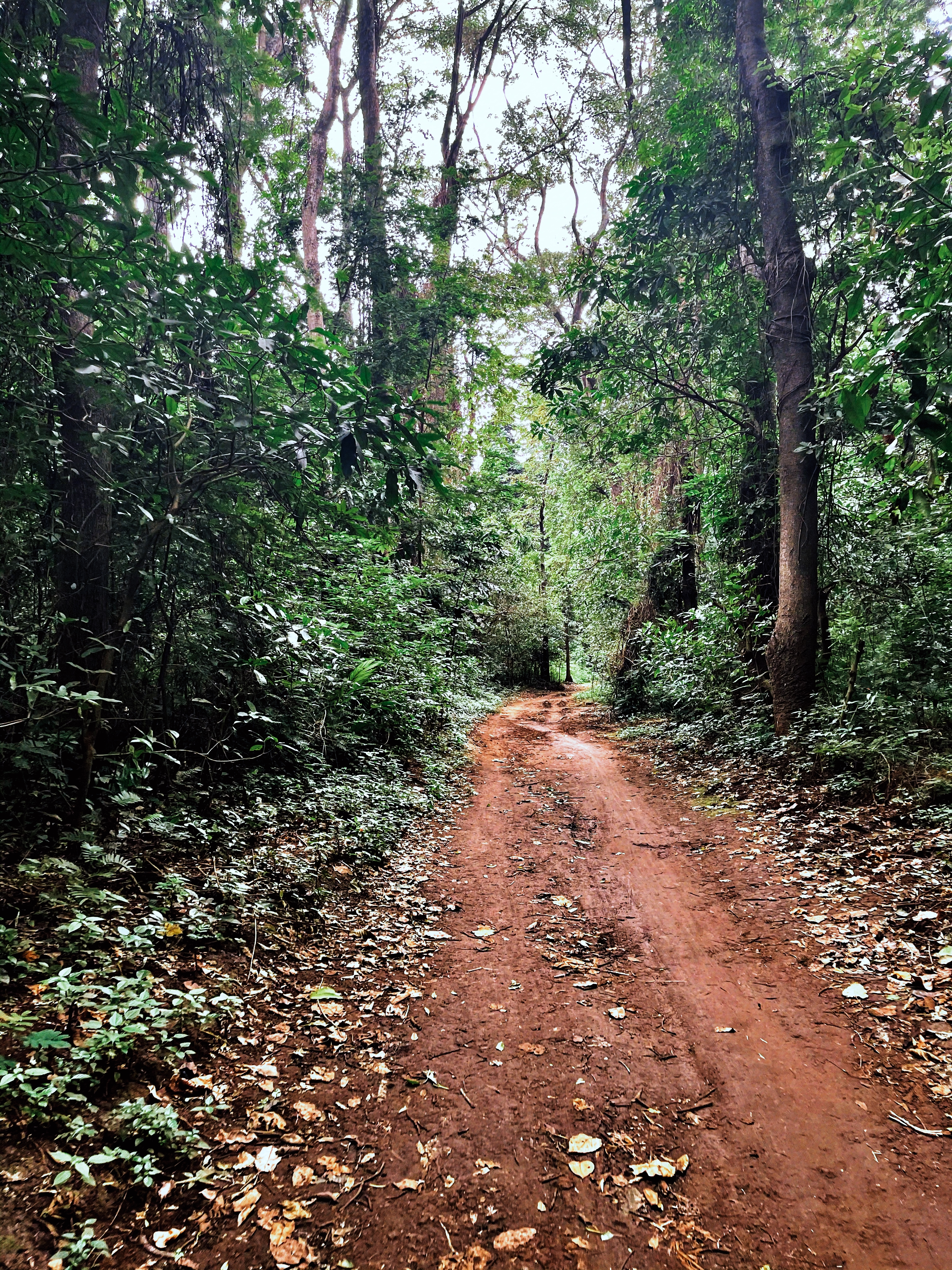
Rau forest in Miembeni Ward, Moshi

== Administrative subdivisions ==
=== Wards ===
The Moshi Urban District is administratively divided into 21 wards:

1. Bondeni
2. Kaloleni
3. Karanga
4. Kiboriloni
5. Kilimanjaro
6. Kiusa
7. Korongoni

1. Longuo
2. Majengo
3. Mawenzi
4. Mji Mpya
5. Msaranga
6. Njoro
7. Rau

1. Pasua
2. Ng'ambo
3. Mfumuni
4. Miembeni
5. Soweto
6. Boma Mbuzi
7. Shirimatunda

== Education ==
As of 2022, there were 80 Schools in Moshi Urban District, 52 of are primary schools and 28 are secondary schools.
