= William Howlett =

Irish physician and neurologist (born 1946)

William Patrick Howlett (born 16 March 1946) is an Irish general physician and neurologist whose work primarily focuses on the study and treatment of neurological diseases in Africa. He is known for his contributions to the early diagnosis of AIDS and to the understanding of konzo, a foodborne disease. In 2019, he received the Irish Presidential Distinguished Service Award, presented to Irish citizens abroad who have brought honor to their nation.

== Medical career and contribution ==
=== Early education ===
Howlett completed his medical training between 1970 and 1975. He began as an intern in Dublin, then continued with residency training in internal medicine in the United States at St. Mary’s Hospital in Rochester, New York. Upon returning to Ireland, he worked as a registrar and tutor in medicine at University Hospital Galway and Mercer's Hospital, Dublin.

=== Work in Uganda ===
He first traveled to Africa in 1980 as part of the humanitarian response to the famine in Karamoja, Uganda, after completing a Diploma in Tropical Medicine and Hygiene at the London School of Hygiene and Tropical Medicine. He was responsible for restoring medical services at a regional hospital in Moroto that had been looted and left inoperative due to civil conflict. Its function was restored within four weeks.

=== Kilimanjaro Christian Medical Centre (KCMC) ===
In 1983, Howlett joined the Kilimanjaro Christian Medical Centre (KCMC) in Moshi, under the Ministry of Health. His work at KCMC has spanned over four decades, interrupted only by the completion of his PhD at the University of Bergen (1995) and his neurology training at King's College London (1998). He resumed his position at KCMC in 2006, focusing on teaching, research, and clinical practice.

=== Research on Konzo ===
One of Howlett’s contributions to neurology is his research on konzo, a subacute tropical myelopathy caused by chronic cyanide poisoning from the consumption of improperly processed cassava. This research formed the basis of his PhD thesis and has been instrumental in understanding the condition's etiology and clinical features.

=== HIV/AIDS Research and Public Health Advocacy ===
Howlett played a role in the early documentation and response to the HIV/AIDS epidemic in Tanzania. He presented the first cases of AIDS at KCMC in 1986 and was actively involved in public health education to mitigate the disease's spread. His wife, Juliet Hardy, was a founding member of KIWAKKUKI (Women Against AIDS), an organization focused on HIV/AIDS awareness and prevention. Together, they spearheaded numerous educational campaigns, producing pamphlets, posters, and educational materials for Tanzanian communities.

=== Contributions to neurology in Africa ===
Howlett has trained over a thousand Tanzanian doctors and specialists, as well as international neurology trainees through elective programs in tropical neurology. His clinical teaching, noted for its depth and humor, has attracted large groups of students and professionals. He has contributed in establishing neurology training programs in Tanzania and East Africa, which in combination with other efforts lead to the formation of several organizations; The Tanzanian Neuroscience Association (2013), the East African College of Neurology (2014), and the African Academy of Neurology (AFAN, 2015).

== Main publications ==
Howlett’s main academic work is Neurology in Africa, a comprehensive textbook on neurological diseases in the African context. The book has received positive reviews and is freely accessible online through the University of Bergen website. A second edition is available through Cambridge University Press and has recently been translated into French as “Neurologie en Afrique.”

- Howlett, William P. (2015). Neurology in Africa: Clinical Skills and Neurological Disorders (1st ed.). Cambridge: Cambridge University Press. ISBN 978-1107114227.
- Howlett, William P. (12 August 2014). "Neurology in Africa". Neurology. 83 (7): 654–655. doi:10.1212/WNL.0000000000000682.
- Howlett, William P. (12 August 2014). "Inflammatory neurologic disease in sub-Saharan Africa". Neurology. 83 (7): 656–658. doi:10.1212/WNL.0000000000000683.
- Howlett, William P. (October 2018). "The role of LP in NDs where there is no neuroimaging". Journal of the Neurological Sciences. 393: 110–112. doi:10.1016/j.jns.2018.08.005.
- Howlett, William P (20 August 2019). "Neurological disorders in HIV in Africa: a review". African Health Sciences. 19 (2): 1953. doi:10.4314/ahs.v19i2.19. PMC 6794503.
- Howlett, William Patrick (October 2022). "Rapidly progressive dementia: limitations in Africa". Practical Neurology. 22 (5): 342–343. doi:10.1136/practneurol-2022-003385.

== Documentary and Legacy ==
His contributions to global health have been chronicled in the documentary Lasting Dream by Joris Bulstra, which reflects on his decades-long career in Africa. The film highlights his work with HIV/AIDS, konzo, and neurology in Africa, providing a historical perspective on the medical and social impact of these diseases.

== Recognition ==
In 1990, he was appointed as Pope John Paul II's personal physician during the pontiff's visit to Moshi, accompanying the official caravan on the 40-kilometer journey from the airport to the town. In 2019, he received the Irish Presidential Distinguished Service Award, which recognizes service given to Ireland, or to Irish communities abroad, by those who live outside Ireland.

== Private life ==
Howlett is a widower; he was married to Juliet Hardy, a nurse who played a central role in HIV/AIDS education in Tanzania and worked alongside him until her death in 1995. Their son, Patrick Howlett, is a medical doctor and pulmonologist working in the UK. Patrick previously worked in Sierra Leone during the Ebola epidemic. In his early years, William played Gaelic football for St. James GAA club and later represented the Wexford County Senior team for two years. In 1968, his team won the Sigerson Cup and traveled to the United States to represent Ireland.

== Bibliography ==
- Bartle, Elinor. "William Howlett – Humanitarian and Global Health specialist". University of Bergen. Archived from the original on December 14, 2019.. News archive for Centre for International Health, 2019.
- Looby, David (30 November 2019). "President hails Campile doctor's life-saving work in Africa". Irish Independent.
- Marieke Dekker, "William Howlett", Global Health Section Newsletter, American Academy of Neurology, 2016
- Lasting Dream, a documentary on William Howlett by Joris Bulstra (2022).
