= Governor Dundas =

Governor Dundas may refer to:

- Thomas Dundas (British Army officer) (1750–1794), Governor of Guadeloupe in 1794
- George Dundas (colonial administrator) (1819–1880), Governor of Prince Edward Island from 1859 to 1868
- Charles Dundas (governor) (1884–1956), Governor of the Bahamas from 1933 to 1940 and Governor of Uganda from 1940 to 1943
- Lawrence Dundas, 2nd Marquess of Zetland (1876–1961), Governor of Bengal from 1917 to 1922
- Francis Dundas (1759–1824), Acting Governor of the Cape Colony between 1798 and 1803
- Philip Dundas (1762–1807), Governor of Prince of Wales Isle (Penang) from 1805 to 1807
