= Rau (Tanzanian ward) =

Ward in Moshi Urban District, Kilimanjaro Region

Rau Ward Kata ya Rau (Swahili)
- Ward
- Kata ya Rau, Wilaya ya Moshi Mjini
- Location within Tanzania
- Country: Tanzania
- Region: Kilimanjaro Region
- District: Moshi District

Area
  - Total: 3.8 km^{2} (1.5 sq mi)
- Elevation: 897 m (2,943 ft)

Population (2012)
  - Total: 9,137
  - Density: 2,400/km^{2} (6,200/sq mi)

Rau is an administrative ward in Moshi District of Kilimanjaro Region in Tanzania. The ward covers an area of 3.8 km^{2} (1.5 sq mi), and has an average elevation of 897 m (2,943 ft). According to the 2012 census, the ward has a total population of 9,137.
