= Kilimanjaro Native Co-operative Union =

Tanzanian Federation

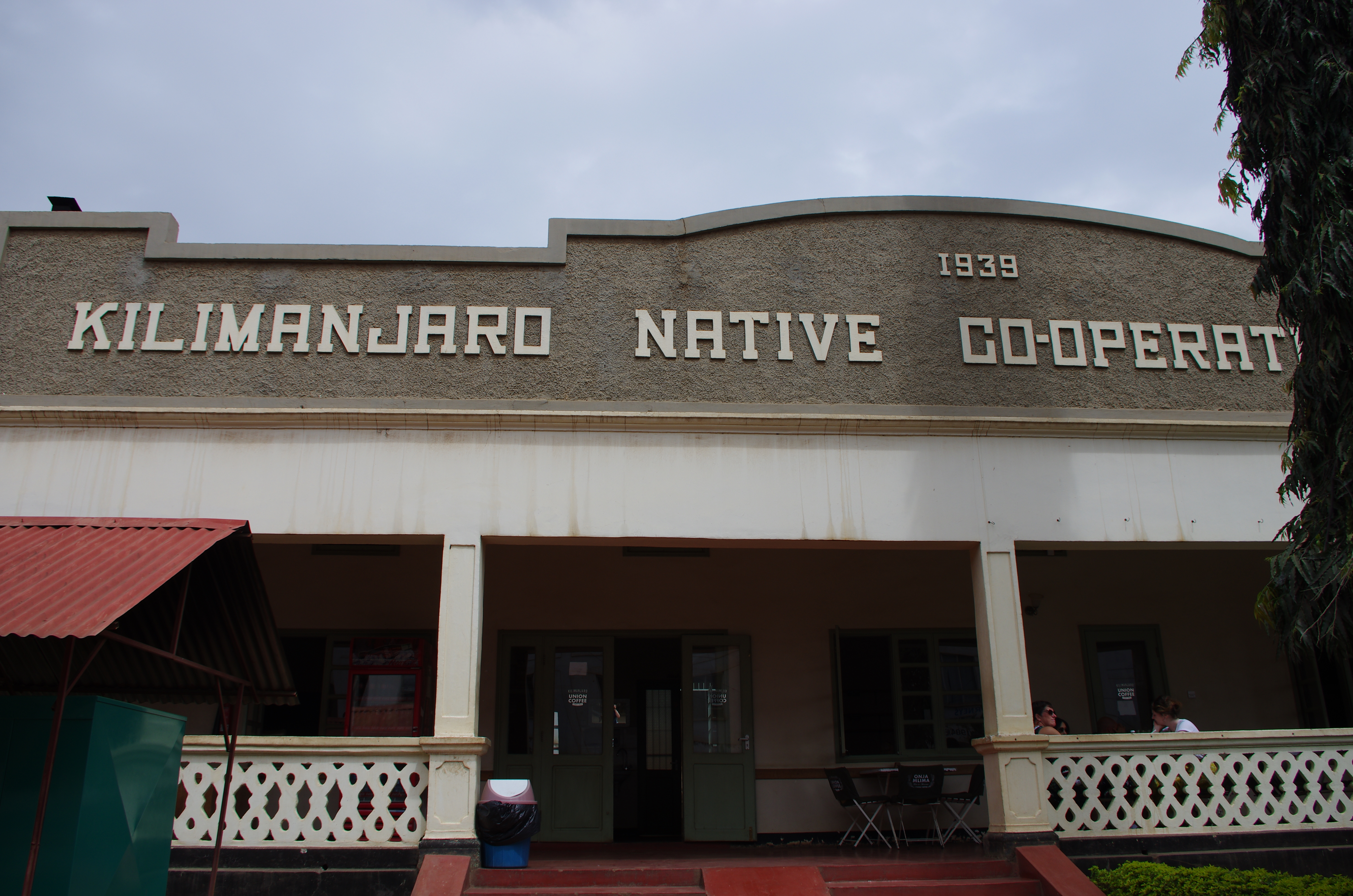
The Union Café

Kilimanjaro Native Co-operative Union (KNCU) is a cooperative federation in Tanzania and the oldest cooperative in the country, founded in 1930 by Charles Dundas. KNCU is owned by the farmers of the 90 primary cooperative societies which buy coffee from the farmers on Kilimanjaro. Offices for the cooperative are located in Moshi.

KNCU flourished in the 1950s and 1960s and drove much of the development of the Kilimanjaro Region. In 1977 it was nationalised by the government. This act was reversed in 1984 and KNCU became independent again, although subject to government control of their buying and marketing. Since then, the primary co-operatives and their union have gradually won back their independence. The liberalisation of the coffee industry in the early 1990s saw private companies competing with the cooperatives to buy the coffee of their members. Many cooperatives in Tanzania died. KNCU initially lost 80% of its market and struggled for four years. Since 1998, it has steadily won back market share and is now the largest buyer of Kilimanjaro smallholder coffee. KNCU has also worked closely with the Fair Trade movement and supplies coffee for the Fair Trade Certified Kilimanjaro Roasted Coffee from Cafédirect.
