= Boma Mbuzi =

Ward in Moshi Urban District, Kilimanjaro Region

Boma Mbuzi Ward Kata ya Boma Mbuzi (Swahili)
- Ward
- Kata ya Boma Mbuzi, Wilaya ya Moshi Mjini
- Location within Tanzania
- Country: Tanzania
- Region: Kilimanjaro Region
- District: Moshi District

Area
  - Total: 1 km^{2} (0.39 sq mi)
- Elevation: 795 m (2,608 ft)

Population (2012)
  - Total: 15,776
  - Density: 16,000/km^{2} (41,000/sq mi)

Boma Mbuzi is an administrative ward in Moshi District of Kilimanjaro Region in Tanzania. The ward covers an area of 1 km^{2} (0.39 sq mi), and has an average elevation of 795 m (2,608 ft). According to the 2012 census, the ward has a total population of 15,776.
