= Al Noor Kassum =

Tanzanian politician (1924–2021)

Honourable Al Noor Kassum

Member of the Tanzanian Parliament

Personal details
- Born: Noordin Kassum; 11 January 1924 Tanganyika
- Died: 18 November 2021 (aged 97) Dar es Salaam, Tanzania
- Party: CCM
- Other political affiliations: TANU
- Spouse: Yasmin (1983–2021)
- Children: 3
- Positions: Chancellor, SUA; Chancellor, MUCCoBS
- Notable work(s): Africa's Winds of Change: Memoirs of an International Tanzanian
- Nickname: Nick

Al Noor Kassum (11 January 1924 – 18 November 2021) was a Tanzanian politician.

== Biography ==
He was educated in Tanganyika and the United Kingdom, where he was called to the Bar at the Inns of Court in London, Al Noor Kassum was a prominent figure in Tanzanian politics and the Ismaili Muslim community after the country's independence. He held several ministerial positions within the Tanzanian government and was also the East African Community's Minister of Finance and Administration. He held senior positions in UNESCO and at the UN Headquarters in New York. Also he was the 2nd Chancellor of Sokoine University of Agriculture (SUA) in Morogoro Tanzania.

Kassum died in Dar es Salaam on 18 November 2021, at the age of 97.
