= Battle of Moshi =

1892 battle in Tanzania

- Part of the German Empire's conquest of East Africa
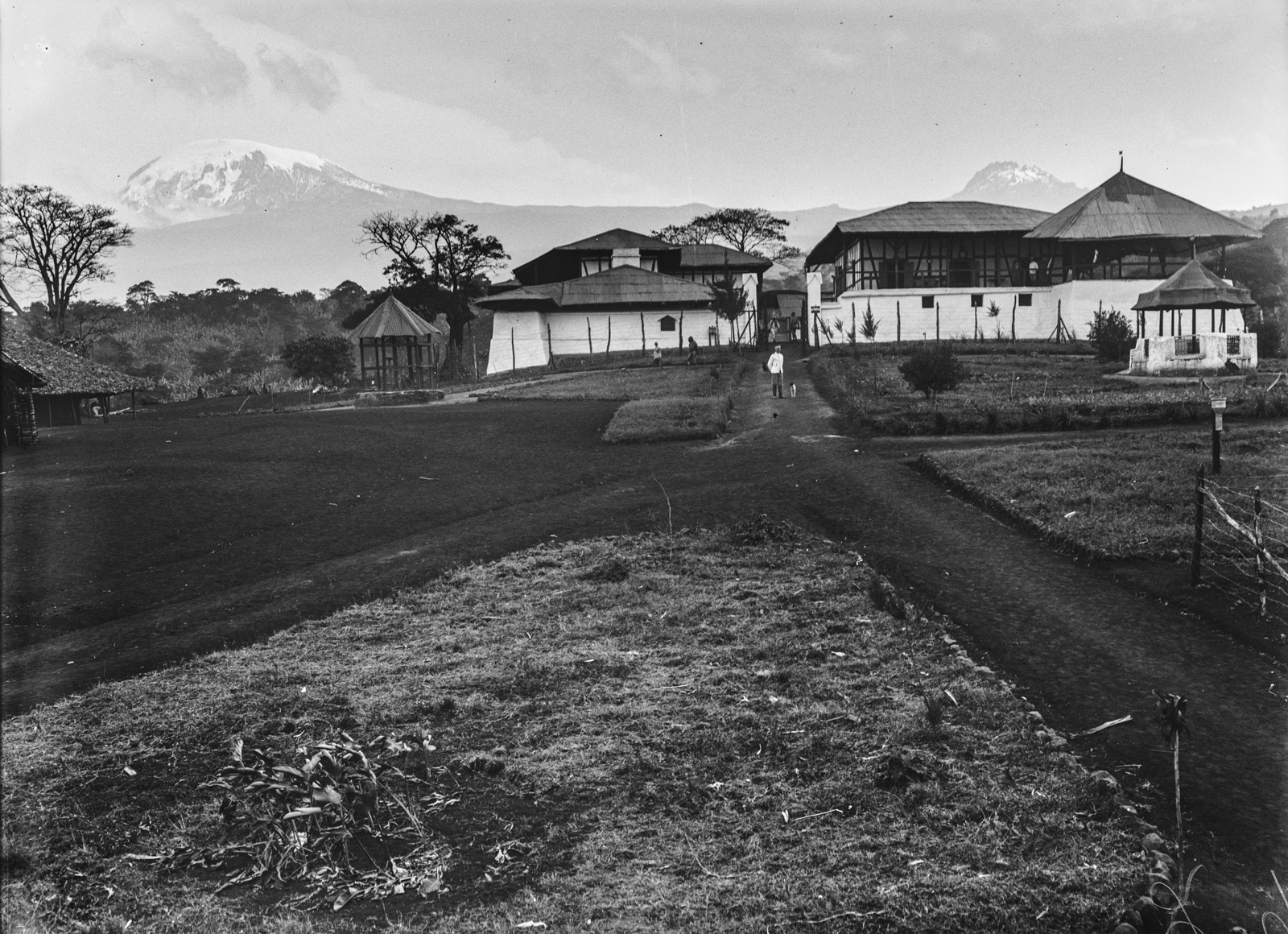
- Moshi station built after the battle of Moshi 1892
Date	12 August 1892
Location	Moshi, German East Africa
Result	German victory

Belligerents
German Empire: German East Africa	Moshi Kingdom of the Chagga states

Commanders and leaders
Friedrich von Schele	Mangi Meli

Strength
~1,400	~1,500

Casualties and losses
5	135

The Battle of Moshi (12 August 1893) was fought in what is now modern day city of Moshi in Kilimanjaro Region of Tanzania. The battle was between German Empire led by Von Burlow, and the Moshi kingdom led by Mangi Meli.

== Background ==
Von Bulow's first mission against Moshi 10 June 1892 encountered an ambush and came dangerously close to being wiped out. After losing both of its German officers, the remaining Askaris panicked and fled to Marealle's Marangu. There was no German presence on Mount Kilimanjaro for nearly two months while waiting for another team to be dispatched. By sending his own men into the abandoned German garrison with orders to fire off their guns periodically and give the impression that it was still manned by regular forces, Marealle prevented the destruction of his capital. Additionally, he propagated rumors claiming that a new white commandant had already arrived. This ruse seems to have fooled Meli since he refrained from attacking.

On July 31, 1893, Col. Friedrich von Schele, the deputy governor, led the Germans as they retreated to Kilimanjaro. They established a base in Marangu and began a campaign to conquer Moshi and put an end to what they referred to as "the Chagga revolt" by doing so. Early on, Marealle supplied the troops with provisions, and this time he gave them a trustworthy navigator who knew how to get to Meli's boma in time for a surprise attack. However, he refused to allow any German forces to accompany the army and steal loot out of fear of Meli's reprisal, so the Germans instead mustered 800 Kibosho.

On August 11, von Schele marched out, taking a different path from the one that had killed von Bulow, and they surprised the Moshi from behind by using the path that rose up the mountain west of Meli's boma and up Kidongonyi River. The order of the fight was:

- 1st Company (Johannes) 116 askaris,
- 3rd Company (Podlech) 124 askaris,
- 4th Company (Mergler) 113 askaris,
- 5th Company (von Elpons),
- Mixed Company (Ax) 103 askaris,
- Artillery detachment 1 x 65 mm field,
- Gun 1 x 37 mm,
- Mountain gun 1 x Maxim,
- 600 porters,
- 800 Chagga allies from Kibosho.
- 23 German officers and non-commissioned officers were also present.

== The battle ==
On August 12, around 6:15 a.m., the Germans started moving toward Meli's boma. It was similarly concealed in a thick banana plantation like Sina's, and it wasn't until a guide was sent by Marealle that it was identified. Doctor Becker, the expedition's medical officer, reported that some soldiers carried incendiary grenades that they used to light some neighboring cottages on fire in order to betray the location of the fort. The artillery was then brought into play to provide cover fire.

Here, there is a difference between the sources. Von Schele's report claims that three Maxim guns were set up in trees and fired into the boma, but according to Becker, only one Maxim was actually used, as the other two guns were much heavier and would have been difficult to lift into the trees, let alone shoot from. In any case, because it was unable to immediately see the opposing positions, the supporting fire was not very effective.

Lieutenant Ax led his mixed company in a bayonet attack on a position that had been identified by the Moshi riflemen's muzzle flashes, but the askaris were unable to bridge a 15-foot (4.6 m) ditch that covered their fire trench. With some of his soldiers hurt, Ax withdrew and prepared another assault, which he preceded with a few volleys in an effort to rattle the defenders.

Ax was then killed after the second attempt failed as well. Sergeant Weinberger, the last remaining German in the group, took the reins and led the men forward a third time. 'An enemy bullet destroyed the flagstaff in Weinberger's hand, the flag was torn with holes, but the standard-bearer himself was fortunate to escape unharmed, despite many of our colored soldiers fell,' claims Becker. Von Schele gave the command for the company to remain on the defense after this third attempt failed.

The 1st and 4th Companies passed the ditch surrounding the boma without any opposition, but it was undefended elsewhere. Johannes suggested to von Schele via runner that the entire force follow him through this opening before redeploying for a concluding assault on the boma. This was done, despite the fact that it exposed Doctor Becker's dressing station to enemy fire in a hazardous manner.

The 1st Company and the artillery were now in front, around 500 yards (457 meters) from the boma, thanks to the altered deployment. They were escorted by Sina's men, whose unappreciated work it was to cut down the banana trees as they moved forward to clear a route. The other companies formed a tight formation and pulled up somewhat to the rear. As the troops moved forward, the cannon started firing, and the Moshi warriors soon began to flee. It came out that Meli's boma wasn't as strong as Sina's and wasn't built to withstand a significant attack. Meli instead pulled back his troops and gathered them in a gully on the opposite bank of a river.

The German troops were now positioned on a ridge overlooking the river and opened firing on them from this commanding height an hour and a half later, at around 2:00 p.m., when they reappeared and prepared for a mass onslaught. Now Meli requested peace terms, freely acknowledging, in Becker's words, that he had been a "sheep's head" for believing he was more powerful than the Germans. He was permitted to continue serving as chief but had to construct a new post for the Germans close to his home.

The Kibosho group, meantime, stole all of his animals as retaliation for his Meli's father's action against them. About 135 people had died and a similar number had been wounded in Meli. German losses totaled five fatalities and 24 injuries. A second scheme by Marealla, who convinced the Germans that his adversary was once more preparing to rebel, led to Meli's hanging by the Germans in 1900. The Chagga resistance on Mount Kilimanjaro came to an end as a result.

== Aftermath ==
According to German records, Moshi suffered 135 fatalities and more than 100 injuries, while four Askaris and one non-commissioned officer from Germany were all killed in action. The following day, on August 13, Col. von Schele gave the instructions for the 800 Kibosho warriors to enter the abandoned homes, set them on fire, and drive away any remaining cattle.

Meli's house, which contained the magnificent gifts that his father Rindi had given him, was among the homes that were destroyed. A sewing machine from the Kaiser was one of these gifts, which the German forces later used as a spit for roasting meat. Ironically, just as the Moshi had done the same for Kibosho just 18 months earlier, the Kibosho assisted the Germans in conquering Moshi.
