= Miembeni, Moshi Mjini =

Ward in Moshi Urban District, Kilimanjaro Region

Miembeni Ward Kata ya Miembeni (Swahili)
- Ward
- Kata ya Miembeni, Wilaya ya Moshi Mjini
- Location within Tanzania
- Country: Tanzania
- Region: Kilimanjaro Region
- District: Moshi District

Area
  - Total: 1.8 km^{2} (0.69 sq mi)
- Elevation: 799 m (2,621 ft)

Population (2012)
  - Total: 15,220
  - Density: 8,500/km^{2} (22,000/sq mi)

Miembeni is an administrative ward in Moshi District of Kilimanjaro Region in Tanzania. The ward covers an area of 1.8 km^{2} (0.69 sq mi), and has an average elevation of 799 m (2,621 ft). According to the 2012 census, the ward has a total population of 15,220.
