= Moshi Co-operative University =

Public university in Tanzania

Coordinates: 3°20′12″S 37°20′18″E

- Chuo Kikuu cha Ushirika Moshi (Swahili)
- Other names: MoCU
- Former names: Moshi University College of Co-operative and Business Studies; MuCCoBS (2004)
- Motto: Ushirika ni Biashara (Swahili)
- Motto in English: Co-operative is Business
- Type: Public
- Established: 5 January 1963; 63 years ago as college; 2014; 12 years ago as university
- Chairman: George D. Yambesi
- Chancellor: Pius Msekwa
- Vice-Chancellor: Alfred S. Sife
- Location: Moshi, Tanzania
- Campus: Urban
- Website: University website

The Moshi Co-operative University (MoCU) is a public university in Moshi, Tanzania.

== History ==
The history of this university dates to 5 January 1963 when the Co-operative College Moshi was established. The college's primary responsibility was training of human resources in the co-operative sector under the Ministry of Co-operatives and Community Development. The college was subsequently established through the Co-operative College Act No. 32 (Repealed) of 1964 as an autonomous institution with its own Governing Board.

In 2004, the Co-operative College Moshi was transformed into Moshi University College of Co-operative and Business Studies (MUCCoBS) as the Constituent University College of Sokoine University of Agriculture through the Government Declaration Order No. 22 of 2004.

In 2014, MUCCoBS was upgraded into full-fledged university. Former Minister Al Noor Kassum served as the chancellor. The institution offers certificate, diploma, degree, master's degree and PhD programs.

Notable Alumni

- Paul Makonda. Dar es Salaam Regional Commissioner.
