= Njoro (Tanzanian ward) =

Ward in Moshi Urban District, Kilimanjaro Region

Njoro Ward Kata ya Njoro (Swahili)
- Ward
- Kata ya Njoro, Wilaya ya Moshi Mjini
- Location within Tanzania
- Country: Tanzania
- Region: Kilimanjaro Region
- District: Moshi District

Area
  - Total: 2 km^{2} (0.77 sq mi)
- Elevation: 788 m (2,585 ft)

Population (2012)
  - Total: 14,296
  - Density: 7,100/km^{2} (19,000/sq mi)

Njoro is an administrative ward in Moshi District of Kilimanjaro Region in Tanzania. The ward covers an area of 2 km^{2} (0.77 sq mi). According to the 2012 census, the ward has a total population of 14,296.
