= Kiboriloni =

Ward in Moshi Urban District, Kilimanjaro Region

Kiboriloni Ward Kata ya Kiboriloni (Swahili)
- Ward
- Kata ya Kiboriloni, Wilaya ya Moshi Mjini
- Location within Tanzania
- Country: Tanzania
- Region: Kilimanjaro Region
- District: Moshi District

Area
  - Total: 6 km^{2} (2.3 sq mi)
- Elevation: 903 m (2,963 ft)

Population (2012)
  - Total: 9,206
  - Density: 1,500/km^{2} (4,000/sq mi)

Kiboriloni is an administrative ward in Moshi District of Kilimanjaro Region in Tanzania. The ward covers an area of 6 km^{2} (2.3 sq mi), and has an average elevation of 903 m (2,963 ft). According to the 2012 census, the ward has a total population of 9,206.
