= Kaloleni (Moshi Urban ward) =

Ward in Moshi Urban District, Kilimanjaro Region

Kaloleni Ward Kata ya Kaloleni (Swahili)
- Ward
- Kata ya Kaloleni, Wilaya ya Moshi Mjini
- Location within Tanzania
- Country: Tanzania
- Region: Kilimanjaro Region
- District: Moshi District

Area
  - Total: 3.18 km^{2} (1.23 sq mi)
- Elevation: 769 m (2,523 ft)

Population (2012)
  - Total: 6,554
  - Density: 2,060/km^{2} (5,340/sq mi)

Kaloleni is an administrative ward in Moshi District of Kilimanjaro Region in Tanzania. The ward covers an area of 3.18 km^{2} (1.23 sq mi), and has an average elevation of 769 m (2,523 ft). According to the 2012 census, the ward has a total population of 6,554.
