= Longuo =

Ward in Moshi Urban District, Kilimanjaro Region

Longuo Ward Kata ya Longuo (Swahili)
- Ward
- Kata ya Longuo, Wilaya ya Moshi Mjini
- Location within Tanzania
- Country: Tanzania
- Region: Kilimanjaro Region
- District: Moshi District

Area
  - Total: 4.6 km^{2} (1.8 sq mi)
- Elevation: 958 m (3,143 ft)

Population (2012)
  - Total: 6,632
  - Density: 1,400/km^{2} (3,700/sq mi)

Longuo also known as Longuo B is an administrative ward in Moshi District of Kilimanjaro Region in Tanzania. The ward covers an area of 4.6 km^{2} (1.8 sq mi), and has an average elevation of 958 m (3,143 ft). According to the 2012 census, the ward has a total population of 6,632.
