= Mfumuni =

Ward in Moshi Urban District, Kilimanjaro Region

Mfumuni Ward Kata ya Mfumuni (Swahili)
- Ward
- Kata ya Mfumuni, Wilaya ya Moshi Mjini
- Location within Tanzania
- Country: Tanzania
- Region: Kilimanjaro Region
- District: Moshi District

Area
  - Total: 2.0 km^{2} (0.77 sq mi)
- Elevation: 862 m (2,828 ft)

Population (2012)
  - Total: 4,750
  - Density: 2,400/km^{2} (6,200/sq mi)

Mfumuni is an administrative ward in Moshi District of Kilimanjaro Region in Tanzania. The ward covers an area of 2.0 km^{2} (0.77 sq mi), and has an average elevation of 862 m (2,828 ft). According to a 2012 census, the ward has a population of 4,750.
