= Kilimanjaro Christian Medical Centre =

Coordinates: 3.320064°S 37.327283°E

The Kilimanjaro Christian Medical Centre is a large hospital in Moshi, Tanzania opened in March 1971 by the Good Samaritan Foundation. It has 630 official beds, 90 canvas, 40 baby incubators, 1852 students and 1300 staff. It is part of a complex including Kilimanjaro Clinical Research Institute and Kilimanjaro Christian Medical University College.

It is the zonal referral hospital located in the Kilimanjaro Region, northern zone of The United Republic of Tanzania. Between December 2016 and December 2017 3,450 cancer patients were referred though only 600 patients were expected when the cancer unit was introduced in December 2016. A traumatic brain injury patient registry was established in 2013 and had data on more than 4000 patients in 2018. About half of the patients in the registry were injured in traffic crashes, and about half of those were motorcyclists, many being boda boda drivers.

It has an established audio-visual tele-mentoring link with the surgical team at Northumbria Healthcare NHS Foundation Trust which supports laparoscopic surgery.

The Duke Global Health Institute sends students to the centre to carry out field research.
