= Ng'ambo, Moshi Mjini =

Ward in Moshi Urban District, Kilimanjaro Region

Ng'ambo Ward Kata ya Ng'ambo (Swahili)
- Ward
- Kata ya Ng'ambo, Wilaya ya Moshi Mjini
- Location within Tanzania
- Country: Tanzania
- Region: Kilimanjaro Region
- District: Moshi District

Area
  - Total: 3.8 km^{2} (1.5 sq mi)
- Elevation: 828 m (2,717 ft)

Population (2012)
  - Total: 7,890
  - Density: 2,100/km^{2} (5,400/sq mi)

Ng'ambo is an administrative ward in Moshi District of Kilimanjaro Region in Tanzania. The ward covers an area of 2.2 km^{2} (0.85 sq mi), and has an average elevation of 828 m (2,717 ft). According to the 2012 census, the ward has a total population of 7,890.
