= United World College East Africa =

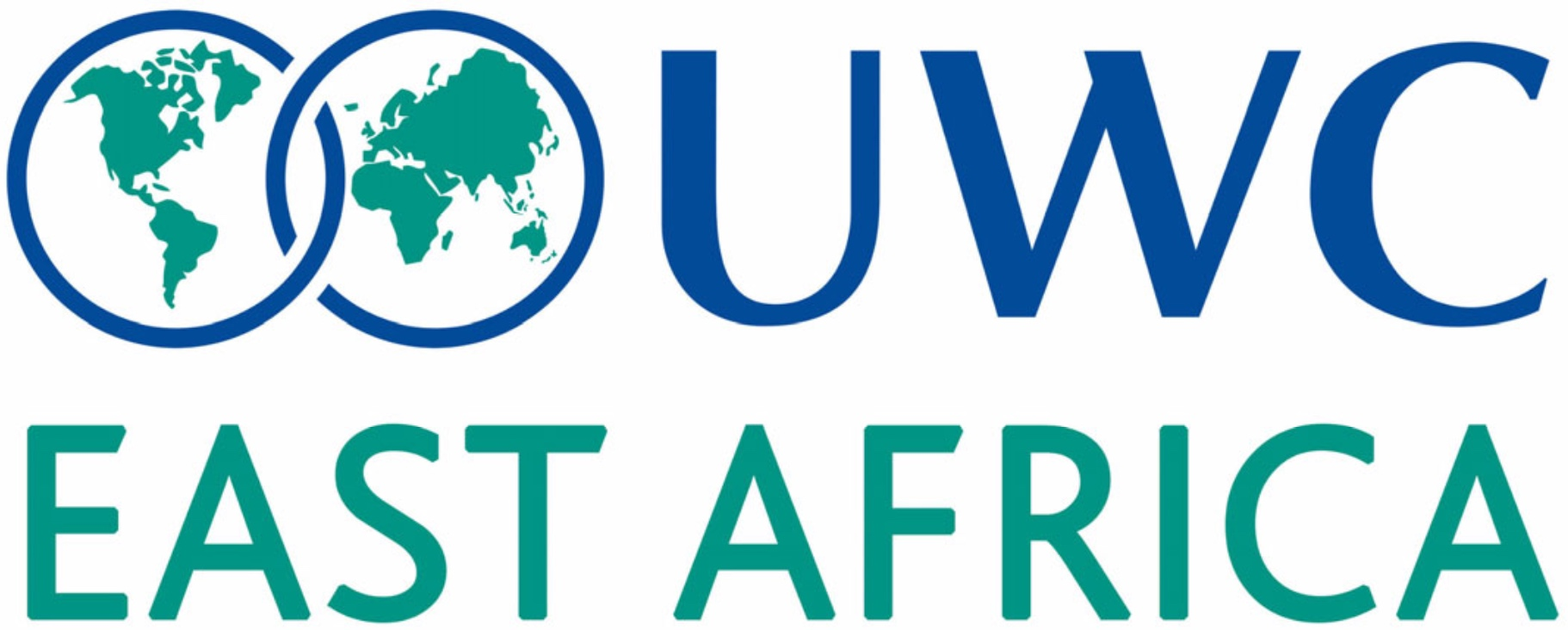

Location
- Lema Road; Moshi, Kilimanjaro Region; Tanzania
- Coordinates: 03°19′28″S 37°19′5″E

Information
- School type: Private
- Motto: Making education a force to unite people, nations and cultures for peace and a sustainable future.
- Founded: 1969 (57 years ago)
- CEEB code: 643250
- Chairman: Tine Hemelings
- Director: Anna Marsden
- Head of school: Bob Cofer (Moshi campus); Phil Bowen (Arusha campus)
- Teaching staff: 76
- Grades: Pre-K – 12
- Gender: Co-educational
- Age: 3 to 19
- Enrollment: ~600 (2020–2021)
- Education system: International Baccalaureate
- Language: English
- Campuses: Moshi; Arusha
- Campus type: Urban
- Houses: Mawenzi, Meru, Kibo
- Team name: Rhinos, Leopards
- Accreditation: Middle States Association of Colleges and Schools; Council of International Schools
- Newspaper: The Summit
- School fees: US$7,300 – $18,150; Scholarships available
- Graduates: 110 (2021)
- Affiliation: United World Colleges
- Website: www.uwcea.org

United World College East Africa (UWCEA) is an independent international school in Tanzania, and a member of the United World Colleges movement. Established in 1969 as International School Moshi, the school is based on two campuses on the slopes of Mount Kilimanjaro and Mount Meru near the city of Moshi, the capital of the Kilimanjaro region in north east Tanzania.

It was one of the first international schools in Africa and the first to introduce the International Baccalaureate to the continent in 1975. It formally joined the UWC movement in 2019, changing its name to UWC East Africa.

== Overview ==
The school serves around 600 students aged 3 to 19 years from over 100 different nationalities of which about 250 are residential. The school is based on two campuses.

=== Location and facilities ===
The school is spread across two campuses, Moshi and Arusha, each serving around half of the student body.

The Moshi Campus is on 40 acres of land close to Mount Kilimanjaro, and has a number of residential houses for pupils aged 7 years and older, for PYP, MYP, and DP students. About half the students on the Moshi campus are boarders; others are day students who live with their families in the Moshi area.

The Arusha Campus was established as a day school in 1987 to serve the growing expatriate community in the fast-expanding town of Arusha, approximately 60 miles to the west of Moshi in the vicinity of Mount Meru. Residential facilities for IB Diploma students opened at this campus in August 2019.

UWCEA offers a variety of sporting activities including basketball, tennis, netball, swimming, rugby, football, and athletics on several sports fields and courts at both campuses, and the Moshi campus has an indoor gymnasium and horse stables. Student teams compete in various tournaments as members of the Northern Tanzania Athletics Associations (NTAA).

=== Student body ===
Both campuses serve a mix of local and expatriate families living in northern Tanzania, as well as scholarship students from across the globe. Students at the school from expatriate families are largely drawn from the development community, agencies of the United Nations, religious organisations, and the local business community. Given the school's historical relationship with Lutheran missionary organisations, there have historically been a number of students from Scandinavia.

As of the 2021/22 school year, the school has 640 students representing 115 nationalities, with the graduating class of 2022 consisting of 76 students from the African continent, 31 European, 12 Middle Eastern, 10 each from Asia, North America, and South America, and one student from Oceania.

=== Outdoor activities ===
The school's outdoor and experiential learning curriculum is inspired by the geographical and environmental features of the region, which include Mount Kilimanjaro and the Serengeti Plains.

The school offers an outdoor pursuits programme, which is organised into four groups: Peaks, Plains, Rides and Reefs. Students are able to embark on mountaineering expeditions to the summits of Mount Kilimanjaro, Mount Meru, and Mount Hanang, as well as beach cleanup, deep sea diving, and coral reef restoration on the Indian Ocean coast near the town of Pangani, where the school runs a Field Study Center. Hiking, camping, and mountain biking in the surrounding countryside are also offered. Students are taught wilderness skills, and learn teamwork and leadership.

== History ==
=== Founding as ISM ===
The International School Moshi was founded in 1969. The Good Samaritan Foundation (GSF) was establishing a teaching hospital in Moshi, known as the Kilimanjaro Christian Medical Centre. To serve the needs of families working with the hospital, GSF partnered with the Evangelical Lutheran Church in Tanzania and in America, the Baptist Mission, and the United Evangelical Mission in Germany, to open an international school in the Kilimanjaro region. Jorene Mortenson, whose husband was involved in establishing the Medical Center, was the founding principal. These organisations remain involved in the school as members of the governing board, and as shareholders. Despite the Christian organisations involved in the school's founding and governance, the school is not religious, and serves students regardless of faith.

In 1987, ISM expanded by adding the Arusha Campus for day students only, to serve the growing expatriate community in the town of Arusha.

=== Joining the UWC Movement ===
In 2019, the school became a member of the United World Colleges movement, as the 18th college, and the second in Africa, after Waterford Kamhlaba United World College of Southern Africa in Eswatini. The mission of the UWC movement and of the school is to "make education a force to unite people, nations and cultures for peace and a sustainable future". The first United World College, the United World College of the Atlantic, was founded in 1962 by Kurt Hahn, who had previously established Outward Bound and the Duke of Edinburgh Award, as well as schools at Salem (Germany) and Gordonstoun (Scotland). With the support of individuals including Louis Mountbatten and Prince Charles, this was soon followed by colleges in Canada and Singapore. Today, it is a group of 18 colleges in Europe, the Americas, Africa, and Asia, with Queen Noor of Jordan serving as President of the UWC International Board.

It is expected that joining the UWC movement will result in a change to the composition of the student body, with a wider range of international students attending the school, and over half being granted financial support through scholarships. Application, selection, and the granting of scholarships is coordinated through the UWC's global network of national committees.

== Academics ==
The school began offering International Baccalaureate courses in 1973, which makes it the oldest IB school in Africa, and in 1975 it became the first school in Africa to introduce the International Baccalaureate Diploma. Although a number of other schools on the continent have since adopted the curriculum, it remains a rarity, with less than 2% of all IB schools in the world being located in Africa.

It offers a full range of courses from pre-kindergarten to the International Baccalaureate Diploma. It is one of the few schools globally to offer the complete range of IB programmes, including the Primary Years Programme (PYP), the Middle Years Programme (MYP), and the IB Diploma Programme.

=== Development of the IB Middle Years Programme ===
The school is considered the "birthplace" of the International Baccalaureate's Middle Years Programme. The school identified a pedagogical disconnect stemming from teaching the British O-levels curriculum to students aged 11–16, and then the International Baccalaureate Diploma for students 16–18. The headmaster at the time, Lister Hannah, led discussions on the potential of developing a new two year pre-IB curriculum at the Association of International Schools in Africa conference in Nairobi in October 1978. Hannah, together with the heads of the International School of Lusaka, Zambia and the International School of Tanganyika in Dar es Salaam, Tanzania, engaged in discussions with the International Baccalaureate Organization and the International Schools Association (ISA) about establishing a new pre-IB programme.

In 1980, the school hosted a conference of the International Schools Association (ISA) in Moshi, titled 'the Needs of the Child in the Middle Years of Schooling (ages 11–16)'. This conference recommended the development of a pre-IB course to meet the needs of students aged 11–16 years, with a focus on six key 'needs', which were described as Global, Intellectual, Personal, Physical, Creative, and Social. Further workshops and conferences (Lusaka in 1981, New York City in 1981, Wersen in 1981, London in 1982, and Cyprus in 1983) brought additional schools into the conversation, including the International School of Geneva, the United Nations International School in New York City, and the Vienna International School, and established a framework for what would become the Middle Years Programme. From 1983 to 1990 the discussions crystallized into a five-year curriculum for students aged 11–16, rather than a purely pre-IB course. After going through a pilot phase, the programme was taken over by the International Baccalaureate in the early 1990s, officially becoming the IB Middle Years Programme in 1994.

== Gallery ==
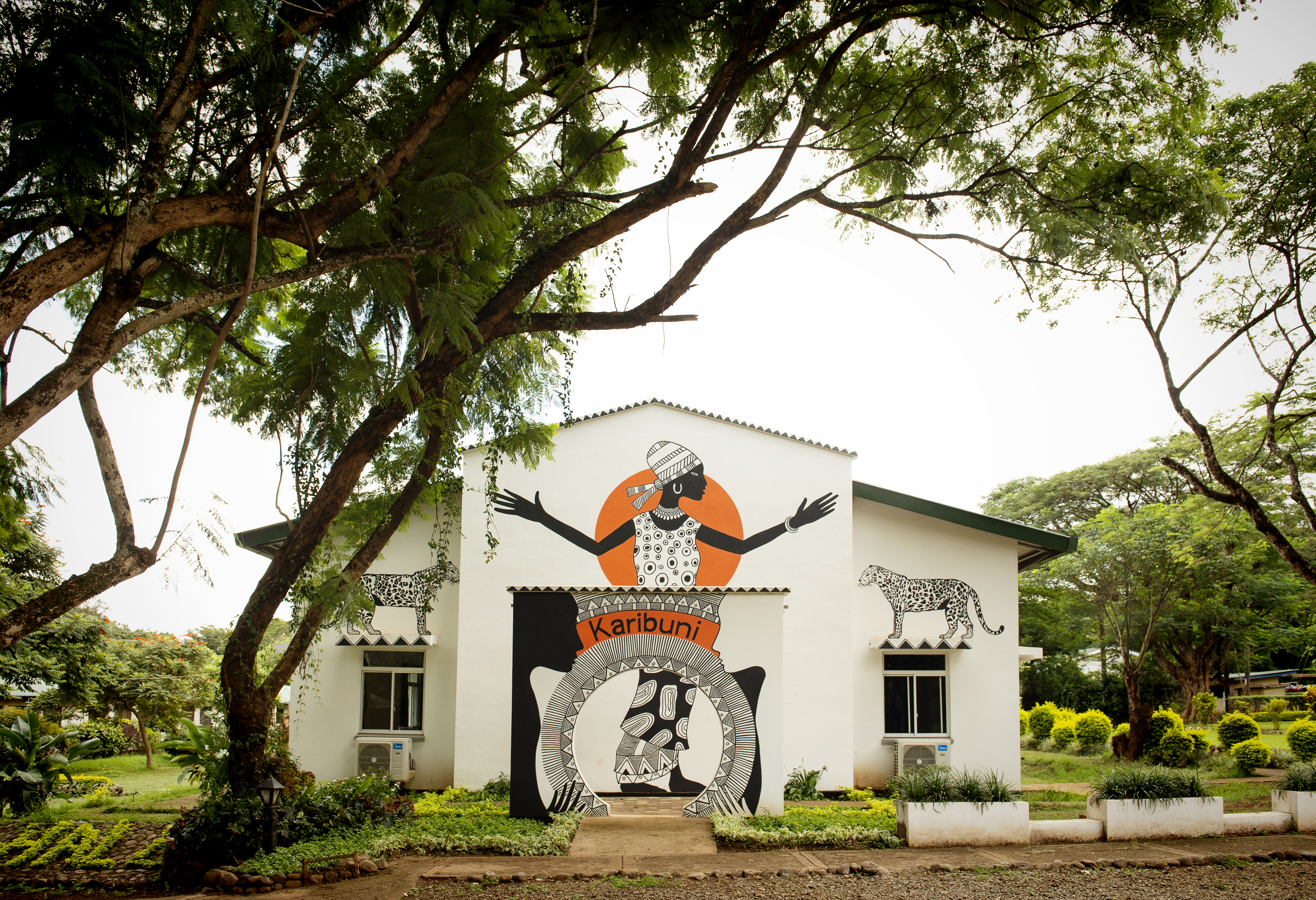
Moshi Campus

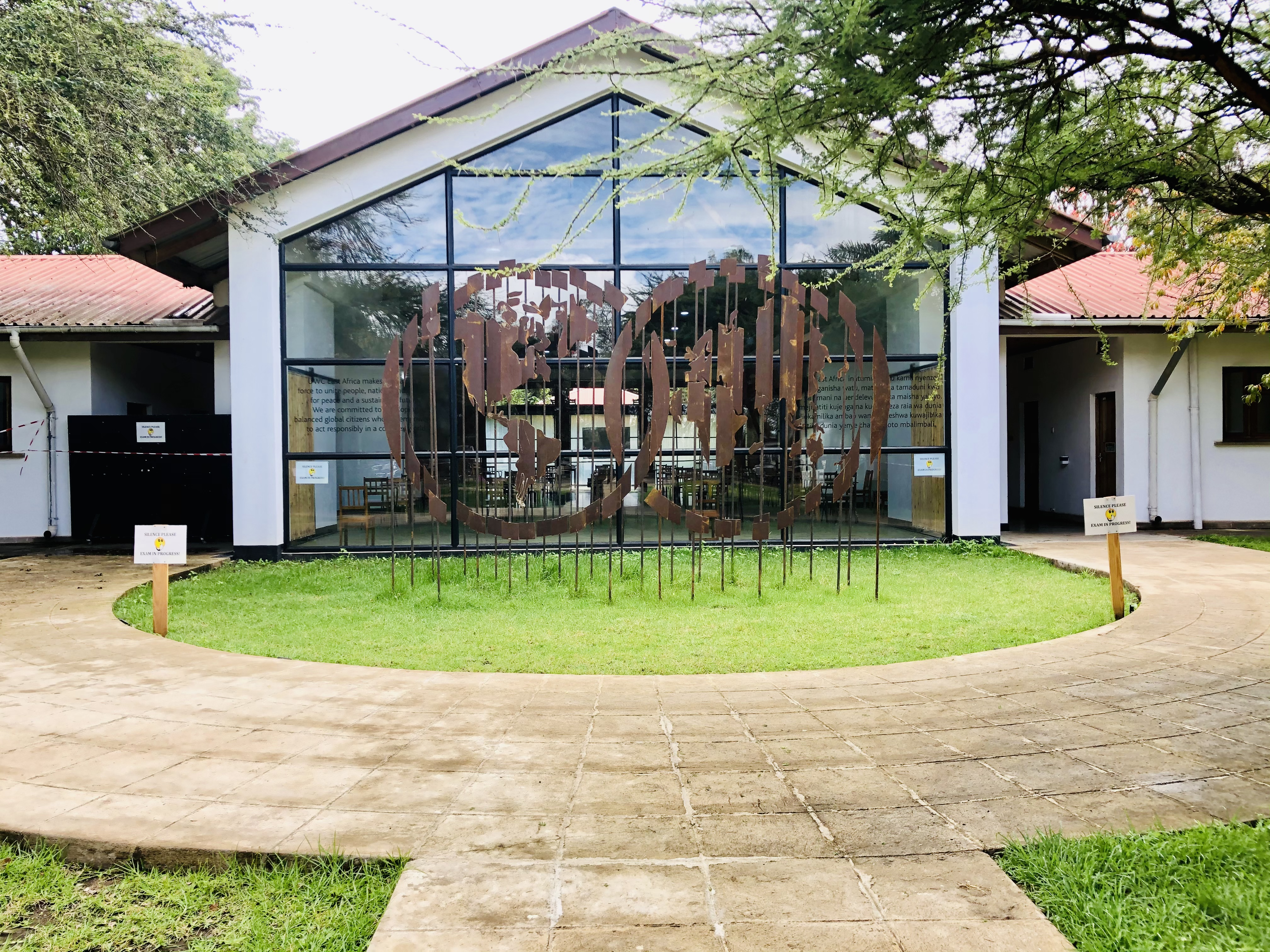
Arusha Campus

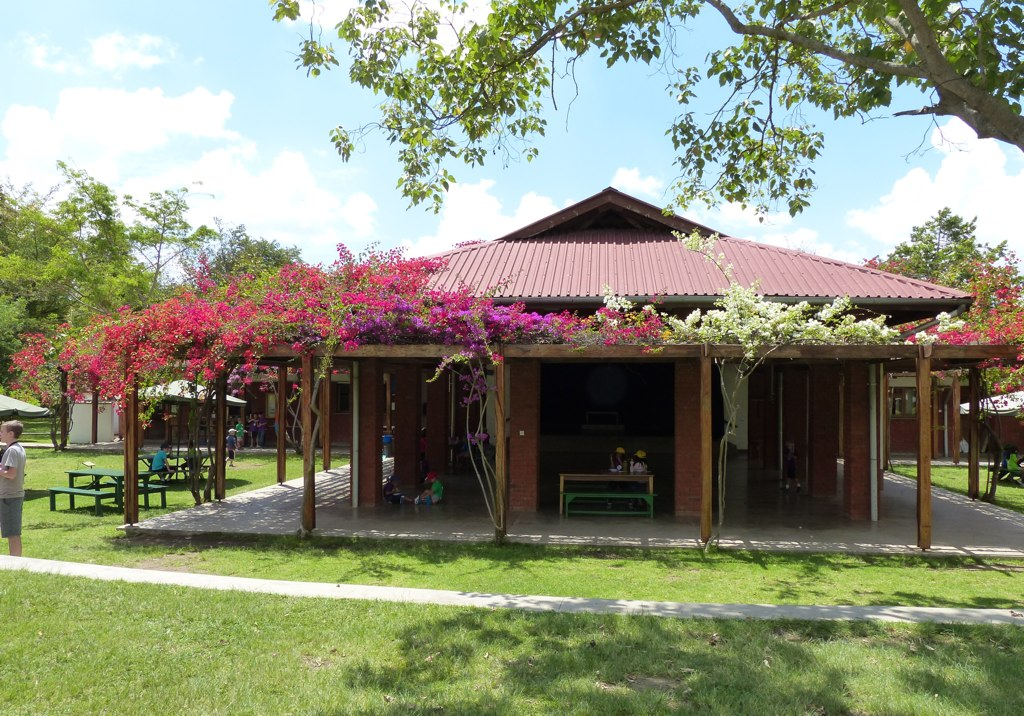
Arusha Campus

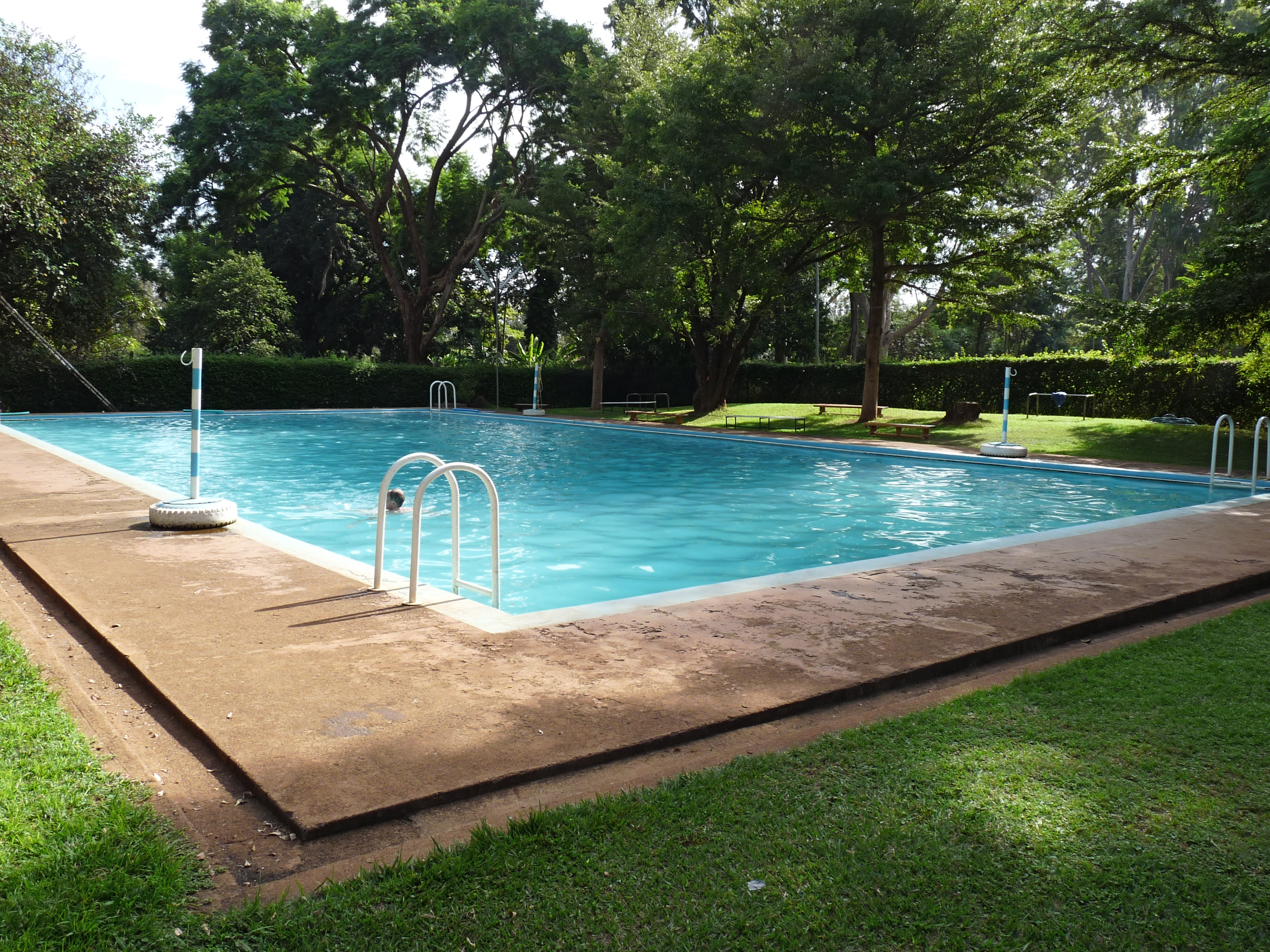

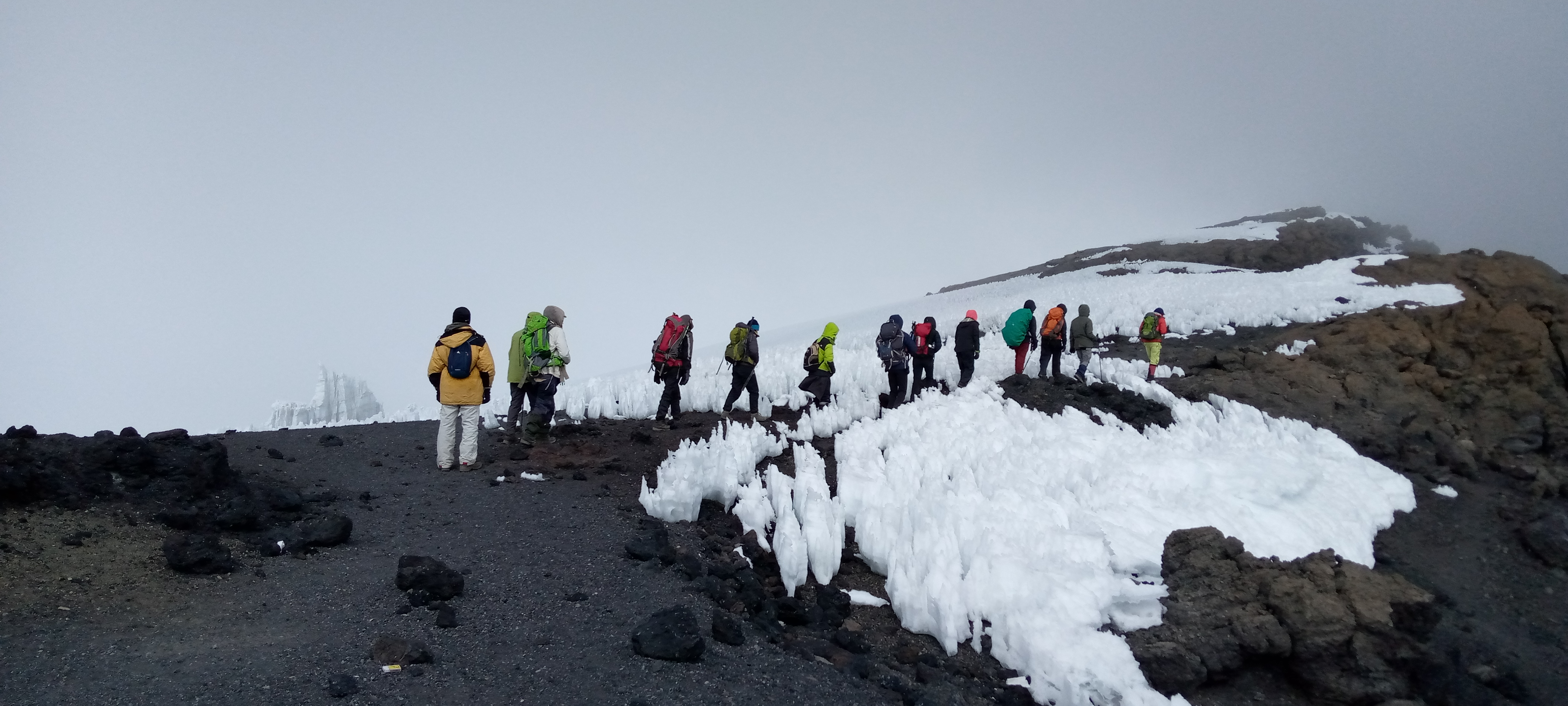
Level 5 Outdoor Pursuits

== See also ==
- Education in Tanzania
- List of schools in Tanzania
- United World Colleges
