= Korongoni =

Ward in Moshi Urban District, Kilimanjaro Region

Korongoni Ward Kata ya Korongoni (Swahili)
- Ward
- Kata ya Korongoni, Wilaya ya Moshi Mjini
- Location within Tanzania
- Country: Tanzania
- Region: Kilimanjaro Region
- District: Moshi District

Area
  - Total: 3.1 km^{2} (1.2 sq mi)
- Elevation: 842 m (2,762 ft)

Population (2012)
  - Total: 5,815
  - Density: 1,900/km^{2} (4,900/sq mi)

Korongoni is an administrative ward in Moshi District of Kilimanjaro Region in Tanzania. The ward covers an area of 3.1 km^{2} (1.2 sq mi), and has an average elevation of 842 m (2,762 ft). According to the 2012 census, the ward has a total population of 5,815.
