= Shirimatunda =

Ward in Moshi Urban District, Kilimanjaro Region

Shirimatunda Ward Kata ya Shirimatunda (Swahili)
- Ward
- Kata ya Shirimatunda, Wilaya ya Moshi Mjini
- Location within Tanzania
- Country: Tanzania
- Region: Kilimanjaro Region
- District: Moshi District

Area
  - Total: 3.2 km^{2} (1.2 sq mi)
- Elevation: 817 m (2,680 ft)

Population (2012)
  - Total: 4,485
  - Density: 1,400/km^{2} (3,600/sq mi)

Shirimatunda is an administrative ward in Moshi District of Kilimanjaro Region in Tanzania. The ward covers an area of 3.2 km^{2} (1.2 sq mi), and has an average elevation of 817 m (2,680 ft). According to the 2012 census, the ward has a total population of 4,485.
