= Msaranga =

Ward in Moshi Urban District, Kilimanjaro Region

Msaranga Ward Kata ya Msaranga (Swahili)
- Ward
- Kata ya Msaranga, Wilaya ya Moshi Mjini
- Location within Tanzania
- Country: Tanzania
- Region: Kilimanjaro Region
- District: Moshi District

Area
  - Total: 6.5 km^{2} (2.5 sq mi)
- Elevation: 818 m (2,684 ft)

Population (2012)
  - Total: 7,699
  - Density: 1,200/km^{2} (3,100/sq mi)

Msaranga is an administrative ward in Moshi District of Kilimanjaro Region in Tanzania. The ward covers an area of 6.5 km^{2} (2.5 sq mi), and has an average elevation of 818 m (2,684 ft). According to the 2012 census, the ward has a total population of 7,699.
