= Kilimanjaro Clinical Research Institute =

Medical research institute based in Moshi, Kilimanjaro, Tanzania

Kilimanjaro Clinical Research Institute (KCRI) is a medical research institute based in Moshi, Kilimanjaro, Tanzania. It forms the third pillar of the Good Samaritan Foundation (GSF), which is foundation based in research. Besides research, patient care is done in the Kilimanjaro Christian Medical Centre (KCMC) and education is done in the Kilimanjaro Christian Medical University College (KCMUCo). As being integrated in a system of hospital care and education, it forms the ideal environment for conducting medical research. The institute is equipped with biotechnology laboratory, Research clinic, Biorepository facility for long-term storage of biological samples, Archive facility and other repository facilities like ware house

== History ==
KCRI evolved from the Kilimanjaro Clinical Research Centre (KCRC) in 2009. KCRC was established in 2006 with the support of the Dutch government through the Netherlands-African partnership for Capacity development and Clinical interventions Against Poverty-related disease (NACCAP). It was part of the APRIORI programme run by Radboud University Medical Center Nijmegen, the Netherlands. The guiding principles of APRIORI included: capacity building, multidisciplinary approach, equal partnership, open communication, long-term commitment, and sustainability. APRIORI followed on a long-term collaboration between Radboud University and KCMC since decades.
