= Karanga River =

River in Kilimanjaro, Tanzania

Coordinates: 3.3426914°S 37.3698527°E

The Karanga River is a river that passes through the Karanga Ward of the Kilimanjaro Region of Tanzania. Its source is at the foot of Mount Kilimanjaro from which it flows southwards to the Nyumba ya Mungu Reservoir.
