= Karanga (Moshi Urban Ward) =

Ward in Moshi, Kilimanjaro, Tanzania

Karanga Kata ya Karanga
- Ward
- Location within Tanzania
- Coordinates: 3.3449536°S 37.3076216°E
- Country: Tanzania
- Region: Kilimanjaro Region
- District: Moshi Urban
- Ward: Karanga

Population (2016)
  - Total: 7,641
- Time zone: UTC+3 (EAT)

Karanga is a ward of Moshi Urban, in the Kilimanjaro Region of Tanzania. Its name is derived from the Karanga River that passes through the ward.

In 2016 the Tanzania National Bureau of Statistics report there were 7,641 people in the ward, from 7,124 in 2012.
