= Mji Mpya =

Ward in Moshi Urban District, Kilimanjaro Region

Mji Mpya Ward Kata ya Mji Mpya (Swahili)
- Ward
- Kata ya Mji Mpya, Wilaya ya Moshi Mjini
- Location within Tanzania
- Country: Tanzania
- Region: Kilimanjaro Region
- District: Moshi District

Area
  - Total: 1.4 km^{2} (0.54 sq mi)
- Elevation: 818 m (2,684 ft)

Population (2012)
  - Total: 15,293
  - Density: 11,000/km^{2} (28,000/sq mi)

Mji Mpya is an administrative ward in Moshi District of Kilimanjaro Region in Tanzania. The ward covers an area of 1.4 km^{2} (0.54 sq mi), and has an average elevation of 818 m (2,684 ft). According to the 2012 census, the ward has a total population of 15,293.
