= Kiusa =

Ward in Moshi Urban District, Kilimanjaro Region

Kiusa Ward Kata ya Kiusa (Swahili)
- Ward
- Kata ya Kiusa, Wilaya ya Moshi Mjini
- Location within Tanzania
- Country: Tanzania
- Region: Kilimanjaro Region
- District: Moshi District

Area
  - Total: 1 km^{2} (0.39 sq mi)
- Elevation: 842 m (2,762 ft)

Population (2012)
  - Total: 5,950
  - Density: 6,000/km^{2} (15,000/sq mi)

Kiusa is an administrative ward in Moshi District of Kilimanjaro Region in Tanzania. The ward covers an area of 1 km^{2} (0.39 sq mi), and has an average elevation of 842 m (2,762 ft). According to the 2012 census, the ward has a total population of 5,950.
