= Bondeni, Moshi Municipal Council, Kilimanjaro =

Ward in Moshi Urban District, Kilimanjaro Region

Bondeni Kata ya Bondeni (Swahili)
- Ward
- Kata ya Bondeni, Wilaya ya Moshi Mjini
- Location within Tanzania
- Country: Tanzania
- Region: Kilimanjaro Region
- District: Moshi District

Area
  - Total: 0.493 km^{2} (0.190 sq mi)
- Elevation: 818 m (2,684 ft)

Population (2012)
  - Total: 4,030
  - Density: 8,170/km^{2} (21,200/sq mi)

Bondeni is an administrative ward in Moshi District of Kilimanjaro Region in Tanzania. The ward covers an area of 0.493 km^{2} (0.190 sq mi), and has an average elevation of 851 m (2,792 ft). According to the 2012 census, the ward has a total population of 4,030.
