= Soweto, Moshi Mjini =

Ward in Moshi Urban District, Kilimanjaro Region

Soweto Ward Kata ya Soweto (Swahili)
- Ward
- Kata ya Soweto, Wilaya ya Moshi Mjini
- Location within Tanzania
- Country: Tanzania
- Region: Kilimanjaro Region
- District: Moshi District

Area
  - Total: 2.8 km^{2} (1.1 sq mi)
- Elevation: 828 m (2,717 ft)

Population (2012)
  - Total: 14,946
  - Density: 5,300/km^{2} (14,000/sq mi)

Soweto is an administrative ward in Moshi District of Kilimanjaro Region in Tanzania. The ward covers an area of 2.8 km^{2} (1.1 sq mi), and has an average elevation of 828 m (2,717 ft). According to the 2012 census, the ward has a total population of 14,946.
