= Charles Dundas (colonial administrator) =

British colonial administrator

Sir Charles Cecil Farquharson Dundas, KCMG, OBE (6 June 1884 – 10 February 1956) was a British colonial administrator who served as Governor of the Bahamas from 1937 to 1940 and Governor of Uganda from 1940 to 1944. He was the fifth son of Charles Saunders Dundas, 6th Viscount Melville.

== Career ==
=== Early career ===
He first served as Assistant District Commissioner in the British East Africa Protectorate in Mombasa from 1908. This was followed by a posting to Nairobi, then a secondment with the Indian Army in German East Africa during World War.

=== Tanzania ===
In 1921, Dundas became district commissioner of the Moshi area in Tanzania and Secretary for Native Affairs about 1925. In 1926, he was made a member of the Executive Council of the Tanganyika Territory.

In 1930, he founded the Kilimanjaro Native Cooperative Union. He popularised the area's coffee production, and was given the title Wasaoye-o-Wachagga (Elder of the Chagga).

Dundas became very popular and respected during his stay at Moshi. When he left Moshi for the last time by train to Tanga and ship to Dar es Salaam, the Chagga reputedly hired a band to accompany him on board the ship and serenade him on his journey. As the boat sailed into Dar es Salaam harbour, the band apparently struck up God Save the King.

=== Bahamas ===
Dundas served as Colonial Secretary of the Bahamas from April 1929 to July 1934.

Later, Dundas was Governor of the Bahamas; appointed in 1937, he was succeeded by the Duke of Windsor in 1940.

=== Uganda ===
Dundas then served as Governor of Uganda.

== Awards and honours ==
Dundas was knighted in 1938. In 1942, he was also appointed a knight of the Venerable Order of the Hospital St John of Jerusalem.

The settlement of Dundas Town in Marsh Harbour, Bahamas was named for him.

== Death ==
Dundas died on 10 February 1956, aged 71, while he was at the barber. He was survived by his wife Anne, Lady Dundas and one sister. A funeral service was held at Holy Trinity Church, Sloane Square. Dundas was buried in Kensal Green Cemetery.

== Bibliography ==
- Sir Charles Dundas, Kilimanjaro and Its Peoples, 1924
- Sir Charles Dundas, African Crossroads, 1955

== Notes ==
Government offices
Preceded by Sir Bede Edmund Hugh Clifford	Governor of the Bahamas; 1937–1940	Succeeded by The Duke of Windsor
Preceded by Sir Philip Mitchell	Governor of Uganda; 1940–1943	Succeeded by Sir John Hall
