= Stefano Moshi Memorial University College =

Coordinates: 3°16′59″S 37°34′25″E

- Swahili: Chuo Kikuu Kishiriki cha Kumbukumbu ya Stefano Moshi
- Type: Private
- Established: 2007; 19 years ago
- Affiliations: Lutheran
- Provost: Prof. Anorld Temu
- Students: 1,252 (2010-11)
- Location: Moshi, Tanzania
- Campus: Rural
- Constituent college of: Tumaini University Makumira
- Website: smmuco.ac.tz

Stefano Moshi Memorial University College (SMMUCo) is a constituent college of Tumaini University Makumira in Moshi, Tanzania.
