= Majengo, Moshi Municipal Council, Kilimanjaro =

Ward in Moshi Urban District, Kilimanjaro Region

Majengo Ward Kata ya Majengo (Swahili)
- Ward
- Kata ya Majengo, Wilaya ya Moshi Mjini
- Location within Tanzania
- Country: Tanzania
- Region: Kilimanjaro Region
- District: Moshi District

Area
  - Total: 0.8 km^{2} (0.31 sq mi)
- Elevation: 827 m (2,713 ft)

Population (2012)
  - Total: 9,006
  - Density: 11,000/km^{2} (29,000/sq mi)

Majengo is an administrative ward in Moshi District of Kilimanjaro Region in Tanzania. The ward covers an area of 0.8 km^{2} (0.31 sq mi), and has an average elevation of 827 m (2,713 ft). According to the 2012 census, the ward has a total population of 9,006.
