= Mawenzi (Moshi Urban ward) =

Ward in Moshi Urban District, Kilimanjaro Region

Mawenzi Kata ya Mawenzi (Swahili)
- Ward
- Kata ya Mawenzi, Wilaya ya Moshi Mjini
- Location within Tanzania
- Country: Tanzania
- Region: Kilimanjaro Region
- District: Moshi District

Area
  - Total: 1.16 km^{2} (0.45 sq mi)
- Elevation: 832 m (2,730 ft)

Population (2012)
  - Total: 1,770
  - Density: 1,530/km^{2} (3,950/sq mi)

Majengo is an administrative ward in Moshi District of Kilimanjaro Region in Tanzania. The ward covers an area of 1.16 km^{2} (0.45 sq mi), and has an average elevation of 832 m (2,730 ft). According to the 2012 census, the ward has a total population of 1,770.
