= Pasua =

Ward in Moshi Urban District, Kilimanjaro Region

Pasua Ward Kata ya Pasua (Swahili)
- Ward
- Kata ya Pausa, Wilaya ya Moshi Mjini
- Location within Tanzania
- Country: Tanzania
- Region: Kilimanjaro Region
- District: Moshi District

Area
  - Total: 2.2 km^{2} (0.85 sq mi)
- Elevation: 789 m (2,589 ft)

Population (2012)
  - Total: 13,460
  - Density: 6,100/km^{2} (16,000/sq mi)

Pasua is an administrative ward in Moshi District of Kilimanjaro Region in Tanzania. The ward covers an area of 2.2 km^{2} (0.85 sq mi), and has an average elevation of 789 m (2,589 ft). According to the 2012 census, the ward has a total population of 13,460.
