= KCMC University =

Coordinates: 3°19′15″S 37°19′47″E

- Motto: Research. Teaching. Healing.
- Type: Private
- Established: 1997; 29 years ago
- Affiliations: Lutheran
- Chairman: Martin Shao
- Provost: Prof. Ephata Elikana Kaaya
- Students: 1,100 (2011)
- Location: Moshi, Tanzania
- Campus: Urban
- Constituent college of: Tumaini University Makumira
- Website: kcmuco.ac.tz

KCMC University, formerly Kilimanjaro Christian Medical University College, is a private university located in Moshi, Tanzania.
