= Leakey (surname) =

Leakey is a surname. Notable people with the name include:

== People ==
- Bob Leakey (1914–2013), inventor, potholer and cave diver
- Caroline Leakey (1827–1881), English writer
- Colin Leakey (born 1933), English botanist
- David Leakey (born 1952), British Army general
- Frida Leakey (1902–1993), British archaeologist and wife of Louis Leakey
- James Leakey (1775–1866), English landscape and portrait painter
- Joshua Leakey (born c. 1988), British recipient of the Victoria Cross
- Louis Leakey (1903–1972), Kenyan archaeologist and naturalist
- Louise Leakey (born 1972), Kenyan paleontologist
- Mary Leakey (1913–1996), British paleoanthropologist
- Meave Leakey (born 1942), British paleontologist
- Nigel Gray Leakey (1913–1941), Kenyan recipient of the Victoria Cross
- Phil Leakey (1908–1992), British make-up artist
- Philip Leakey (born 1949), Kenyan politician
- Rea Leakey (1915–1999), British Army major-general
- Richard Leakey (1944–2022), Kenyan paleontologist, archaeologist and conservationist

== Fictional characters ==
- Mr. Leakey, a magician in J. B. S. Haldane's 1937 children's book My Friend Mr Leakey
