= Leakey family =

British-Kenyan influential family

The Leakey family is a British and Kenyan family consisting of a number of notable military figures, agricultural scientists and archaeologists of the 20th and 21st centuries. The Kenyan branch can be traced back to the Bazett sisters, who were early missionaries at the turn of the 19th Century; with Mary Bazett marrying Harry Leakey before setting up a Mission School at Kabete.

== Notable members ==
=== Archaeology and science ===
- Louis Leakey (1903–1972), archaeologist; son of Harry Leakey and cousin of Nigel and Rea Leakey
- Frida Leakey (1902–1993), archaeologist; first wife of Louis Leakey
- Mary Leakey (1913–1996), archaeologist; second wife of Louis Leakey
- Colin Leakey (1933–2018), plant scientist; son of Louis Leakey
- Meave Leakey (born 1942), palaeoanthropologist; wife of Richard Leakey
- Richard Leakey (1944–2022), politician and palaeoanthropologist; son of Louis and Mary Leakey
- Louise Leakey (born 1972), paleontologist; daughter of Meave and Richard Leakey, married to Prince Emmanuel de Merode

=== Military ===
- Nigel Leakey (1913–1941), Victoria Cross recipient; brother of Rea Leakey
- Major General Rea Leakey (1915–1999), decorated senior British Army officer; brother of Nigel Leakey
- Lieutenant General David Leakey (born 1952), senior British Army officer and former Black Rod
- Joshua Leakey (born c. 1988), Victoria Cross recipient; son of Mark Leakey

=== Politics ===
- Philip Leakey (born 1949), Kenyan politician; son of Louis and Mary Leakey
- Lara Bird (born 1998), Scottish politician, granddaughter of Colin Leakey

=== Other ===
- James Leakey (1775–1866), artist; grandfather of Harry Leakey and great-great-uncle of Nigel and Rea Leakey
- Caroline Leakey (1827–1881), writer; daughter of James Leakey
- Phil Leakey (1908–1992), British make-up artist; great-grandson of James Leakey
- Arundell Gray Leakey, farmer killed in the Mau Mau Uprising; father of Nigel and Rea Leakey
- Robert Leakey (1914–2013), engineer and cave diver; brother of Nigel and Rea Leakey

== Leakey family tree ==
Leakey family tree

James Leakey (1775–1865) (Note: O'Donoghue, F. M.; Remington, V. (revised) (2004). "Leakey, James (1775–1865), miniature painter". Oxford Dictionary of National Biography (online ed.). Oxford University Press. doi:10.1093/ref:odnb/16244. (Subscription, Wikipedia Library access or UK public library membership required.))	Eliza Hubbard Woolmer (1793–1855)
James Shirley Leakey (1824–1871)	Caroline Woolmer Leakey (1827–1881)	8 others	Peter Nettleton Leakey (1830–1906)
Rev. Arundell Leakey (1853–1924)	Rev. Harry Leakey (1868–1940)	Alexander Bazett Leakey (1879–1961)
Elizabeth Laing (1873–1925)	Arundell Gray Leakey (1885–1954)	4 others	Raymond Arundell Leakey (1887–1976)	Henrietta Wilfrida Avern (1902–1993)	Louis Seymour Bazett Leakey (1903–1972)	Mary Douglas Nicol (1913–1996)	3 others	Phil Leakey (1908–1992)
Nigel Gray Leakey (1913–1941)	Robert Dove Leakey (1914–2013)	Maj. Gen. Arundell Rea Leakey (1915–1999)	Agnes Florence Leakey (1917–2006)	Ian Raymond Arundell Leakey (1924–2020)	Colin Louis Avern Leakey (1933–2018)	Meave Epps (b. 1942)	Richard Erskine Frere Leakey (1944–2022)	Margaret Cropper	Jonathan Harry Erskine Leakey (1940–2021)	Philip Leakey (b. 1949)
Lt. Gen. Arundell David Leakey (b. 1952)	Mark Leakey (b. 1956)	Tamsin Leakey	Charles Bird (b. 1954)	Louise Leakey (b. 1972)	Emmanuel, Prince de Mérode (b. 1970)
Joshua Leakey (b. 1988)	Lara Bird (b. 1998)
