= Nigel Leakey =

Recipient of the Victoria Cross

Sergeant Nigel Leakey VC
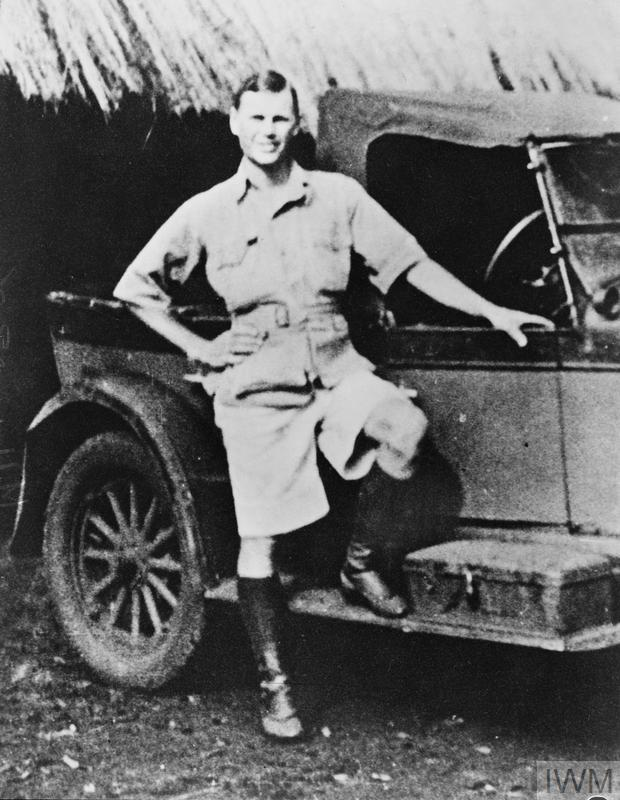
- Sergeant Nigel Leakey, c. 1941
- Born: 1 January 1913; Kiganjo, British East Africa
- Died: 19 May 1941 (aged 28); Kolito, Abyssinia
- Relatives: Rea Leakey (brother); David Leakey (nephew); Louis Leakey (cousin); Richard Leakey (cousin); Joshua Leakey VC (distant cousin)
- Military career
- Allegiance: United Kingdom
- Branch: British Army
- Service years: 1939–1941
- Rank: Sergeant
- Units: King's African Rifles
- Conflicts: Second World War: African theatre; East African campaign
- Awards: Victoria Cross

Nigel Gray Leakey VC (1 January 1913 – 19 May 1941) was a British soldier and a recipient of the Victoria Cross, the highest award for gallantry in the face of the enemy that can be awarded to British and Commonwealth forces.

== Early life ==
Leakey was born in Kiganjo, Kenya to English parents. Leakey's mother Elizabeth died in 1926. His father, Arundell Gray Leakey, was the son of Reverend John Arundell Leakey, clergyman in England. He was a cousin of archaeologists Louis Leakey and Richard Leakey. Leakey's younger brother Rea Leakey served in the Royal Tank Regiment in the Second World War, and later became a major general. His sister Agnes Leakey (later Agnes Hofmeyr) worked for black and white reconciliation in Kenya.

After serving in the Duke of Cornwall's Light Infantry in the early 1900s, Leakey's father became a farmer at Nyeri Station, west of Mount Kenya in Central Province, Kenya, about 4 miles (6.4 km) north of Kiganjo and about 100 miles (160 km) north of Nairobi. His father was an honorary Kikuyu tribesman known as "Morungaru" ("tall and straight"); he was kidnapped and brutally murdered by the Mau Mau in October 1954, and his second wife Mary was also killed.

Leakey was educated in Kenya, and then attended Bromsgrove School in England. Returning to Kenya, at the outbreak of war in 1939 he joined the Kenya Regiment and, after training, was attached to the King's African Rifles.

== Victoria Cross ==
Leakey was a 28 year old sergeant in the 1/6th Battalion, King's African Rifles during the Second World War when the following deed took place for which he was awarded the Victoria Cross. Leakey's 1/6th Battalion was part of the 22nd (East African) Brigade (12th African Division).

On 19 May 1941, at Alaba Kulito, Abyssinia, when Allied forces had made a bridgehead against strong Italian opposition, the Italians made a sudden counterattack with both light and medium tanks. In the face of withering fire, Leakey leaped on top of an Italian tank, wrenched open the turret and killed all the crew except the driver, whom he forced to drive the tank to cover. Along with three others, Leakey tried to repeat this with another Italian tank, but just as he opened the turret, he was killed. The confusion and loss of armour Leakey caused was critical to the Italian defeat in the battle. Captain David Hines witnessed the event through binoculars, as did other soldiers.

Leakey has no known grave but he is commemorated on the East Africa Memorial, near Nairobi, Kenya.

His second cousin twice removed, Joshua Leakey, was also awarded the Victoria Cross for his service in Afghanistan in 2013.

Leakey's medal is kept by a member of the Leakey family in England.

Leakey family tree

James Leakey (1775–1865) (Note: O'Donoghue, F. M.; Remington, V. (revised) (2004). "Leakey, James (1775–1865), miniature painter". Oxford Dictionary of National Biography (online ed.). Oxford University Press. doi:10.1093/ref:odnb/16244. (Subscription, Wikipedia Library access or UK public library membership required.))	Eliza Hubbard Woolmer (1793–1855)
James Shirley Leakey (1824–1871)	Caroline Woolmer Leakey (1827–1881)	8 others	Peter Nettleton Leakey (1830–1906)
Rev. Arundell Leakey (1853–1924)	Rev. Harry Leakey (1868–1940)	Alexander Bazett Leakey (1879–1961)
Elizabeth Laing (1873–1925)	Arundell Gray Leakey (1885–1954)	4 others	Raymond Arundell Leakey (1887–1976)	Henrietta Wilfrida Avern (1902–1993)	Louis Seymour Bazett Leakey (1903–1972)	Mary Douglas Nicol (1913–1996)	3 others	Phil Leakey (1908–1992)	Alexander Graham Leakey (1911–1994)
Nigel Gray Leakey (1913–1941)	Robert Dove Leakey (1914–2013)	Maj. Gen. Arundell Rea Leakey (1915–1999)	Agnes Florence Leakey (1917–2006)	Ian Raymond Arundell Leakey (1924–2020)	Colin Louis Avern Leakey (1933–2018)	Meave Epps (b. 1942)	Richard Erskine Frere Leakey (1944–2022)	Margaret Cropper	Jonathan Harry Erskine Leakey (1940–2021)	Philip Leakey (b. 1949)	Mary Anne Leakey
Lt. Gen. Arundell David Leakey (b. 1952)	Mark Leakey (b. 1956)	Tamsin Leakey	Charles Bird (b. 1954)	Louise Leakey (b. 1972)	Emmanuel, Prince de Mérode (b. 1970)	Olivia Colman (b. 1974)
Joshua Leakey (b. 1988)	Lara Bird (b. 1998)

== See also ==
- East African campaign (World War II)
- Leakey family
