= Bob Leakey =

British inventor, potholer and cave diver

- Born: Robert Dove Leakey; 23 June 1914; Kiganjo, Kenya
- Died: 22 April 2013 (aged 98)
- Known for: Cave exploration, discovery/mapping of Mossdale Cave
- Spouse: Barbara Fidoe

Robert Dove Leakey (23 June 1914 – 22 April 2013) was a British inventor, potholer and cave diver. He has been described as the "Edmund Hillary of potholing". He stood for Parliament in 2005 and 2010; he is thought to be the oldest candidate ever in a UK general election, shortly before his 96th birthday in May 2010.

== Early life and family ==
Leakey was born in Kenya, where his father (Arundell) Gray Leakey was a farmer. Through his great-grandfather James Shirley Leakey, one of the eleven children of the portrait painter James Leakey, he is related to the missionary Rev Henry Leakey, and so to his son and grandson the paleoanthropologists Louis Leakey and Richard Leakey.

His older brother Nigel Leakey was posthumously awarded the Victoria Cross in 1945, for his actions in Ethiopia in 1941. Another relative Joshua Leakey was awarded the Victoria Cross in 2015, for his actions in Afghanistan in 2013. His younger brother Rea Leakey survived service in the Second World War, and became a major-general in the British Army. His sister Agnes Leakey (later Agnes Hofmeyr) worked for reconciliation in Kenya.

He was educated in Kenya and then at Weymouth College. He then studied at the Chelsea College of Aeronautical Engineering, and worked for Vickers.

== Second World War ==
While working as an aircraft designer in the Second World War, a reserved occupation, he discovered the 9 kilometres (5.6 mi) long Mossdale Caverns north of Grassington in the Yorkshire Dales.

He was called up for military service in 1942, the year after his brother Nigel was killed in action, and served as a paratrooper in India and Burma. He failed in two attempts to become the first person to climb the 6,316 metres (20,722 ft) Bandarpunch in the Himalayas.

== Later life ==
After the war, Leakey lived in Settle and then Giggleswick in North Yorkshire. He married his wife Barbara (née Fidoe) in 1947. They had two sons and two daughters.

He became an inventor, securing 20 patents, including one for a folding lobster pot. He also sold fishing equipment, including so-called "Leakey boats". He also served as a magistrate in Settle, and as a governor at Bentham Grammar School.

He continued caving and potholing into the 1960s, and he explored Bar Pot and Disappointment Pot in the Gaping Gill cave system. He was noted for his ability to survive with little or no protective gear, occasionally diving naked into sumps deep underground, and has been described as "seemingly oblivious to the cold".

== Political career ==
Leakey wrote many letters of complaint to different politicians and government departments, but denied that he was eccentric. He founded a political party, the Virtue Currency Cognitive Appraisal Party. He stood as a candidate in local council elections, and stood for Parliament in Skipton and Ripon in the 2005 and 2010 UK general elections. As a result, he is thought to be the oldest candidate ever in a UK general election.

He was survived by his wife, three of his four children, seven grandchildren and four great-grandchildren.

Leakey family tree

James Leakey (1775–1865) (Note: O'Donoghue, F. M.; Remington, V. (revised) (2004). "Leakey, James (1775–1865), miniature painter". Oxford Dictionary of National Biography (online ed.). Oxford University Press. doi:10.1093/ref:odnb/16244. (Subscription, Wikipedia Library access or UK public library membership required.))	Eliza Hubbard Woolmer (1793–1855)
James Shirley Leakey (1824–1871)	Caroline Woolmer Leakey (1827–1881)	9 others
Rev. Arundell Leakey (1853–1924)	Rev. Harry Leakey (1868–1940)
Elizabeth Laing (1873–1925)	Arundell Gray Arundell Leakey (1885–1954)	4 others	Raymond Arundell Leakey (1887–1976)	Henrietta Wilfrida Avern (1902–1993)	Louis Seymour Bazett Leakey (1903–1972)	Mary Douglas Nicol (1913–1996)	3 others
Nigel Gray Leakey (1913–1941)	Robert Dove Leakey (1914–2013)	Maj. Gen. Arundell Rea Leakey (1915–1999)	Agnes Florence Leakey (1917–2006)	Ian Raymond Arundell Leakey (1924–2020)	Colin Louis Avern Leakey (1933–2018)	Meave Epps (b. 1942)	Richard Erskine Frere Leakey (1944–2022)	Margaret Cropper	Jonathan Harry Erskine Leakey (1940–2021)	Philip Leakey (b. 1949)
Lt. Gen. Arundell David Leakey (b. 1952)	Mark Leakey (b. 1956)	Tamsin Leakey	Charles Bird (b. 1954)	Louise Leakey (b. 1972)	Emmanuel, Prince de Mérode (b. 1970)
Joshua Leakey (b. 1988)	Lara Bird (b. 1998)

== See also ==
- Caving in the United Kingdom
