= Philip Leakey =

Kenyan politician

Member of Parliament for Langata Constituency
- In office 1979–1992
- Succeeded by: Raila Odinga

Personal details
- Born: 21 June 1949 (age 77) Nairobi, Kenya
- Party: Kenya African National Union (KANU)
- Spouse: Valerie Fraser Leakey (second wife)
- Children: 3
- Parents: Louis Leakey (father); Mary Leakey (mother)
- Relatives: Richard Leakey (brother); Jonathan Leakey (brother); Colin Leakey (half-brother)
- Education: Lenana School
- Occupation: Politician; entrepreneur
- Known for: First White Kenyan MP since independence

Philip Leakey (born 21 June 1949) is a Kenyan former politician. He was the first White member of the Kenyan Parliament since independence.

== Career ==
Leakey represented the KANU party led by then president Daniel Arap Moi. He was an MP of Langata Constituency from 1979 and served as a cabinet minister for a short stint. He lost his parliamentary seat in the 1992 Kenyan general elections, the first multiparty elections in Kenya, when Raila Odinga won the Langata seat.

Together with his wife Katy Leakey, he runs the Leakey Collection, a company exporting products made by Maasai handicrafts.

His parents are Louis and Mary Leakey, both paleontologists. Philip is brother to Richard and Jonathan Leakey, and half-brother to Colin Leakey. He has three children with his second wife, Valerie Fraser Leakey. He was educated at Lenana School, Nairobi (formerly the Duke of York School).

== Position in the Leakey family ==
Leakey family tree

James Leakey (1775–1865) (Note: O'Donoghue, F. M.; Remington, V. (revised) (2004). "Leakey, James (1775–1865), miniature painter". Oxford Dictionary of National Biography (online ed.). Oxford University Press. doi:10.1093/ref:odnb/16244. (Subscription, Wikipedia Library access or UK public library membership required.)) | Eliza Hubbard Woolmer (1793–1855)
James Shirley Leakey (1824–1871) | Caroline Woolmer Leakey (1827–1881) | 8 others | Peter Nettleton Leakey (1830–1906)
Rev. Arundell Leakey (1853–1924) | Rev. Harry Leakey (1868–1940) | Alexander Bazett Leakey (1879–1961)
Elizabeth Laing (1873–1925) | Arundell Gray Leakey (1885–1954) | 4 others | Raymond Arundell Leakey (1887–1976) | Henrietta Wilfrida Avern (1902–1993) | Louis Seymour Bazett Leakey (1903–1972) | Mary Douglas Nicol (1913–1996) | 3 others | Phil Leakey (1908–1992) | Alexander Graham Leakey (1911–1994)
Nigel Gray Leakey (1913–1941) | Robert Dove Leakey (1914–2013) | Maj. Gen. Arundell Rea Leakey (1915–1999) | Agnes Florence Leakey (1917–2006) | Ian Raymond Arundell Leakey (1924–2020) | Colin Louis Avern Leakey (1933–2018) | Meave Epps (b. 1942) | Richard Erskine Frere Leakey (1944–2022) | Margaret Cropper | Jonathan Harry Erskine Leakey (1940–2021) | Philip Leakey (b. 1949) | Mary Anne Leakey
Lt. Gen. Arundell David Leakey (b. 1952) | Mark Leakey (b. 1956) | Tamsin Leakey | Charles Bird (b. 1954) | Louise Leakey (b. 1972) | Emmanuel, Prince de Mérode (b. 1970) | Olivia Colman (b. 1974)
Joshua Leakey (b. 1988) | Lara Bird (b. 1998)

Notes:

Political offices
| Preceded by Mwangi Maathai | Member of the National Assembly of Kenya for Langata; 1979-1992 | Succeeded by Raila Odinga |
