= Rea Leakey =

British Army Major General (1915–1999)

Major-General Rea Leakey CB DSO MC & Bar
- Born: 30 December 1915; Nairobi, Kenya
- Died: 6 October 1999 (aged 83)
- Relatives: Lieutenant General David Leakey (son); Nigel Leakey (brother)
- Military career
- Allegiance: United Kingdom
- Branch: British Army
- Service years: 1936–1966
- Rank: Major-General
- Service number: 67210
- Unit: Royal Tank Corps
- Commands: GOC Malta and Libya; Director-General of Fighting Vehicles; 7th Armoured Brigade; 5th Royal Tank Regiment
- Conflicts: Second World War: Operation Compass; Siege of Tobruk; Battle of Gazala; Operation Jupiter; Siege of Dunkirk
- Awards: Companion of the Order of the Bath; Distinguished Service Order; Military Cross & Bar; War Cross (Czechoslovakia)

Major-General Arundell Rea Leakey, CB, DSO, MC & Bar (30 December 1915 – 6 October 1999) was a British officer in the British Army. He served in the Royal Tank Regiment in the Second World War, in North Africa, Italy and France. He later served in Korea, in the Arab Legion, and commanded a brigade in the British Army of the Rhine in the 1960s. He served as Director-General of Fighting Vehicles and finally as the commander of British troops in Malta and Libya. He retired in 1966, and became Director of the Wolfson Foundation. An autobiography, Leakey's Luck, was published in 1999.

His father Arundell Gray Leakey and step-mother Mary were murdered by the Mau Mau in Kenya in 1954. His older brother Nigel Leakey was awarded a posthumous Victoria Cross in the Second World War, and a cousin Joshua Leakey was awarded the Victoria Cross in 2015. One of his sons is Lieutenant General David Leakey.

== Early life ==
Leakey was born in Nairobi, Kenya on 30 December 1915. His father, Arundell Gray Leakey, was the son of Reverend John Arundell Leakey, a clergyman in England.

Leakey's father had served in a Volunteer Battalion of the Duke of Cornwall's Light Infantry in the early 1900s, and with the East African Labour Corps during the First World War.

Through his great-grandfather James Shirley Leakey (1824–1871), one of the eleven children of the portrait painter James Leakey, he is related to the missionary Henry Leakey, so to paleoanthropologists Louis Leakey and Richard Leakey.

His older brother Nigel Leakey was posthumously awarded the Victoria Cross in 1945, for his actions in Ethiopia in 1941. Another relative Joshua Leakey was awarded the Victoria Cross in 2015, for his actions in Afghanistan in 2013. His sister Agnes Leakey (1917–2007) (later Agnes Hofmeyr) worked for reconciliation in Kenya.

Leakey's mother Elizabeth died in 1926, when he was 10 years old. He was educated at boarding school in Kenya, and then at Weymouth College in England. After attending the Royal Military College, Sandhurst, he became a second lieutenant in the Royal Tank Corps in 1936. Leakey served with the 1st Battalion in Egypt, where he helped with the invention of the Coles Universal Sun Compass. He was promoted to lieutenant in January 1939.

== Second World War ==
Leakey was serving on the staff of the 4th Armoured Brigade when the Second World War broke out in September 1939. Leakey rejoined his unit, renamed the 1st Royal Tank Regiment, fighting in a Mark VI tank. He commanded a troop and then a squadron, and won the Military Cross at Martuba on 21 January 1941, fighting against Italian forces during Operation Compass.

After German forces arrived in North Africa, Leakey's regiment was sent to form part of the garrison at Tobruk in April 1941. Despite constant attacks from the German Afrika Korps that was besieging Tobruk, Leakey grew bored of garrison life; although by then a temporary captain, he volunteered to serve as a private soldier with the 2/23rd Australian Infantry Battalion for three months. He was awarded a Bar to the Military Cross for actions of 9 August 1941, while serving with the Australians: he is believed to be the only captain in the British Army serving as a lance corporal in the Australian army to win the MC. His exploits were later recounted by The Victor comic in the 1960s.

Leakey was then sent to the Staff College in Haifa. He detoured to visit his father in Kenya, and heard that his older brother Nigel Leakey had died in combat at Kolito in Abyssinia (modern Ethiopia) in May 1941, while serving with the King's African Rifles, for which he was later awarded a posthumous Victoria Cross.

Leakey learned to fly while serving as an Air Intelligence Liaison Officer with No. 451 Squadron RAAF, and was then asked to join the 252nd Indian Armoured Brigade in Persia. Before he left, he returned to visit his regiment near Tobruk towards the end of May 1942. He found himself embroiled in the opening stage of the Battle of Gazala, and he was nearly captured by General Rommel (the commander of the 7th Armoured Division Frank Messervy was captured briefly). Leakey then served as a turret gunner in a Grant tank, before replacing a wounded officer as GSO2 in the headquarters of the 7th Armoured Division. He eventually went to Persia in July 1942, after Rommel's advance stalled near El Alamein.

He transferred back to the 44th Royal Tank Regiment in North Africa, and landed at Taranto after Operation Slapstick as the second-in-command of the 44th RTR, fighting up the east coast of Italy. After returning to England, he landed in Normandy with the 5th Royal Tank Regiment, and fought in Operation Jupiter near Maltot, dominated by Hill 112, then at Le Havre, and with the 1st Czechoslovak Armoured Brigade at the Siege of Dunkirk, winning a Czechoslovak War Cross. He continued to command the 5th RTR (and for a time the 7th Royal Tank Regiment) as Allied forces fought through the Netherlands, and into Germany, until VE Day in May 1945. He volunteered for service in the Far East but the war ended before he arrived.

Leakey was promoted to the substantive rank of captain in 1944, and was appointed to the Distinguished Service Order in 1945 for his leadership of 5th RTR. Although at the time a temporary lieutenant colonel, he was too young at 29-year-old to hold the substantive rank.

== Post-war career ==
Leakey commanded the 5th RTR in Europe until 1947. He was promoted to the rank of major in 1949, and was a company commander at Sandhurst for two years, and then an instructor at the Staff College, Camberley, from 1951 to 1952. He rejoined 5th RTR and spent a year in Korea from 1953 to 1954. From 1954 he commanded the 1st Armoured Car Regiment of the Arab Legion, the army of Jordan, but was dismissed with other British officers in the Arab Legion in 1956. He then joined the headquarters of the 3rd Division in Cyprus.

Promoted to lieutenant colonel in 1955, he spent two years as an instructor at the staff college in Camberley from 1958 to 1960. He commanded the 7th Armoured Brigade in the British Army of the Rhine from 1961 to 1963. Promoted to the rank of major general, he was Director-General of Fighting Vehicles from 1964 to 1966, at the time when the Chieftain tank was introduced to service. His last Army appointment was as General Officer Commanding Headquarters Malta and Libya, supervising British troops in Malta and Libya, 1967-68.

Leakey chose to retire early in 1966, aged 51. He was appointed Companion of the Order of the Bath in the 1967 New Year Honours.

Back in civilian life, he was Director and Secretary of the Wolfson Foundation from 1968 to 1980.

== Private life ==
Leakey married Muriel Irene Le Poer Trench in 1949. They had two sons; one is Lieutenant General David Leakey. After they were divorced in 1984, he married Joan Morant in 1994. An autobiography, Leakey's Luck, was published in 1999 (edited by George Forty). After his death in 1999, his papers were donated to the Liddell Hart Centre for Military Archives at King's College London.

Leakey's father, a farmer at Nyeri Station, west of Mount Kenya in Central Province, Kenya, about 4 miles (6.4 km) north of Kiganjo and about 100 miles (160 km) north of Nairobi. His father was an honorary Kikuyu tribesman known as "Morungaru" ("tall and straight"). He was kidnapped and brutally murdered by the Mau Mau in October 1954. His second wife Mary (née Becher, and formerly married to Hugh Alexander Littleton) was also killed.

Leakey family tree

James Leakey (1775–1865) (Note: O'Donoghue, F. M.; Remington, V. (revised) (2004). "Leakey, James (1775–1865), miniature painter". Oxford Dictionary of National Biography (online ed.). Oxford University Press. doi:10.1093/ref:odnb/16244. (Subscription, Wikipedia Library access or UK public library membership required.))	Eliza Hubbard Woolmer (1793–1855)
James Shirley Leakey (1824–1871)	Caroline Woolmer Leakey (1827–1881)	8 others	Peter Nettleton Leakey (1830–1906)
Rev. Arundell Leakey (1853–1924)	Rev. Harry Leakey (1868–1940)	Alexander Bazett Leakey (1879–1961)
Elizabeth Laing (1873–1925)	Arundell Gray Leakey (1885–1954)	4 others	Raymond Arundell Leakey (1887–1976)	Henrietta Wilfrida Avern (1902–1993)	Louis Seymour Bazett Leakey (1903–1972)	Mary Douglas Nicol (1913–1996)	3 others	Phil Leakey (1908–1992)	Alexander Graham Leakey (1911–1994)
Nigel Gray Leakey (1913–1941)	Robert Dove Leakey (1914–2013)	Maj. Gen. Arundell Rea Leakey (1915–1999)	Agnes Florence Leakey (1917–2006)	Ian Raymond Arundell Leakey (1924–2020)	Colin Louis Avern Leakey (1933–2018)	Meave Epps (b. 1942)	Richard Erskine Frere Leakey (1944–2022)	Margaret Cropper	Jonathan Harry Erskine Leakey (1940–2021)	Philip Leakey (b. 1949)	Mary Anne Leakey
Lt. Gen. Arundell David Leakey (b. 1952)	Mark Leakey (b. 1956)	Tamsin Leakey	Charles Bird (b. 1954)	Louise Leakey (b. 1972)	Emmanuel, Prince de Mérode (b. 1970)	Olivia Colman (b. 1974)
Joshua Leakey (b. 1988)	Lara Bird (b. 1998)
