= James Leakey =

English painter (1775–1865)

James Leakey (1775 – 1865) was an English landscape and portrait artist.

== Life ==
Born on 20 September 1775 in Exeter, Devon, he was the son of John Leakey, who was in the wool trade. At the time of Sir Joshua Reynolds's death he was about to become his pupil.

Leakey established himself at Exeter, painting portraits, miniatures and landscapes. He also produced small interiors with groups of rustic figures and Sir Francis Baring purchased one of those for £500. With the exception of a time in London from 1821 to 1825, during which he was intimate with Thomas Lawrence, David Wilkie, and other leading painters, Leakey's life was mostly passed at Exeter. He died there on 16 February 1865.

== Works ==
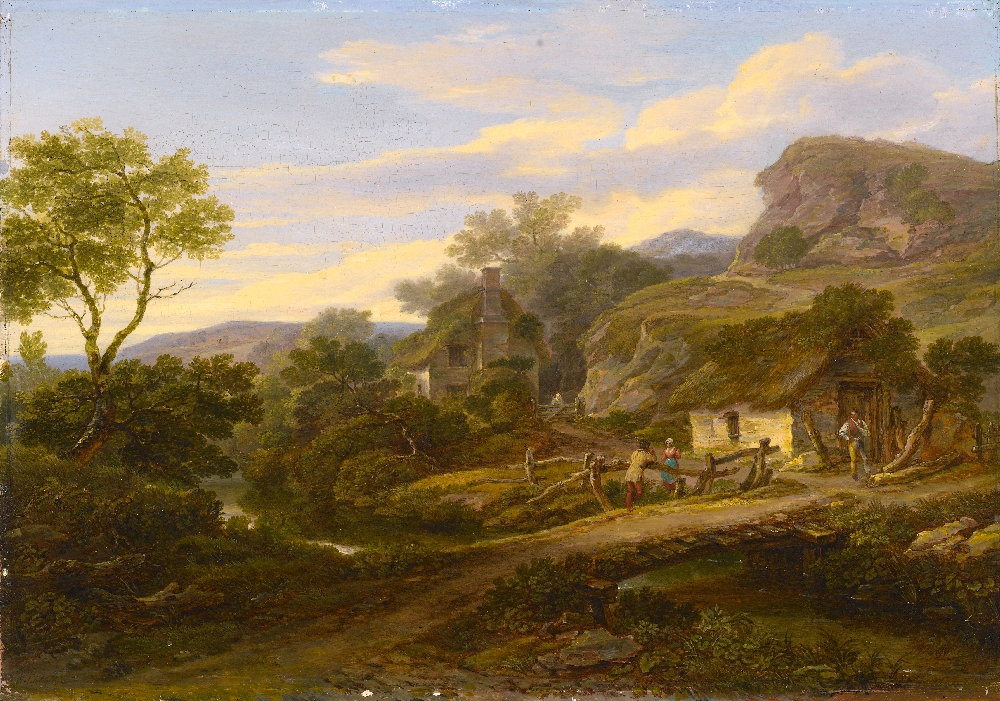
Devonshire Landscape by James Leakey

Leakey exhibited at the Royal Academy in 1821 The Marvellous Tale, in 1822 The Fortune Teller, in 1838 portraits and landscapes, and in 1846 The Distressed Wife.

Leakey was best known for his delicate miniatures, painted in oils on ivory. These brought him a local celebrity. In the Exeter Guildhall there is a portrait by him of Henry Blackhall, mayor of Exeter; also a copy by him of Reynolds's portrait of John Rolle Walter. His portrait of John Haddy James (1788-1869), surgeon, is in the Royal Devon and Exeter Hospital. In 1846 Leakey published a plate by Samuel Cousins, from his portrait of John Rashdall, minister of Bedford Chapel, Exeter.

== Family ==
By his marriage in 1815 with Eliza Hubbard Woolmer, Leakey had eleven children. They included the writer Caroline Leakey.

He is the founding member of the Leakey family, with branches specialising in archaeology and the military.

Leakey family tree

James Leakey (1775–1865) (Note: O'Donoghue, F. M.; Remington, V. (revised) (2004). "Leakey, James (1775–1865), miniature painter". Oxford Dictionary of National Biography (online ed.). Oxford University Press. doi:10.1093/ref:odnb/16244. (Subscription, Wikipedia Library access or UK public library membership required.))	Eliza Hubbard Woolmer (1793–1855)
James Shirley Leakey (1824–1871)	Caroline Woolmer Leakey (1827–1881)	9 others
Rev. Arundell Leakey (1853–1924)	Rev. Harry Leakey (1868–1940)
Elizabeth Laing (1873–1925)	Arundell Gray Arundell Leakey (1885–1954)	4 others	Raymond Arundell Leakey (1887–1976)	Henrietta Wilfrida Avern (1902–1993)	Louis Seymour Bazett Leakey (1903–1972)	Mary Douglas Nicol (1913–1996)	3 others
Nigel Gray Leakey (1913–1941)	Robert Dove Leakey (1914–2013)	Maj. Gen. Arundell Rea Leakey (1915–1999)	Agnes Florence Leakey (1917–2006)	Ian Raymond Arundell Leakey (1924–2020)	Colin Louis Avern Leakey (1933–2018)	Meave Epps (b. 1942)	Richard Erskine Frere Leakey (1944–2022)	Margaret Cropper	Jonathan Harry Erskine Leakey (1940–2021)	Philip Leakey (b. 1949)
Lt. Gen. Arundell David Leakey (b. 1952)	Mark Leakey (b. 1956)	Tamsin Leakey	Charles Bird (b. 1954)	Louise Leakey (b. 1972)	Emmanuel, Prince de Mérode (b. 1970)
Joshua Leakey (b. 1988)	Lara Bird (b. 1998)

== Notes ==
Attribution

This article incorporates text from a publication now in the public domain: Lee, Sidney, ed. (1892). "Leakey, James". Dictionary of National Biography. Vol. 32. London: Smith, Elder & Co.
