= Colin Leakey =

English plant scientist and academic

- Born: Colin Louis Avern Leakey; 13 December 1933; Cambridge, England
- Died: 29 January 2018 (aged 84); Lincoln, England
- Education: Gresham's School, Cambridge University (MA, PhD); Exeter University; University of the West Indies, Trinidad,
- Known for: World authority on beans
- Spouse: Susan
- Children: 3
- Parents: Louis Leakey (father); Frida Leakey (mother)
- Relatives: Richard Leakey, Philip Leakey (half-brothers); Lara Bird (granddaughter)
- Awards: Currie Memorial Prize (Exeter)
- Scientific career
- Fields: Plant science
- Workplaces: Makerere University, Uganda,
- Author abbrev. (botany): C.L.Leakey

Colin Louis Avern Leakey (13 December 1933 – 29 January 2018) was a British plant scientist, a Fellow of King's College, Cambridge and of the Institute of Biology, and a world authority on beans.

== Background ==
Colin Leakey was the son of Louis Leakey (1903–1972), the pioneering paleoanthropologist, and Frida (Avern) Leakey, of Newnham College, Cambridge. His paternal grandparents were Church of England missionaries in British East Africa; his father grew up amidst the Kikuyu people and spent almost all his life in what became Kenya. His parents met in 1927 and married the following year. Their first child was a daughter, Priscilla Muthoni; Colin was their only other child. Louis left Frida just after Colin was born. He grew up with his mother and sister in Cambridge, and did not see his father again until he was 19.

By his father's second marriage to Mary Leakey, Leakey was half-brother to Richard, a conservationist, Philip, a politician, and Jonathan, a businessman. Many of the Leakey family have made contributions to archaeology and anthropology. His mother never remarried.

== Education ==
Gresham's

After Gresham's School, Holt, Leakey served his national service in the Royal Naval Volunteer Reserve, including a year on the staff of Lord Mountbatten who was then Commander in Chief of the Mediterranean Fleet. Leakey then studied physiology, biochemistry, botany and the history and philosophy of science for a first degree in Natural Sciences at King's College, Cambridge. He later trained in tropical agriculture and tropical plant pathology at Exeter University and the University of the West Indies, Trinidad, receiving a postgraduate Diploma in Tropical Agriculture, specialising in tropical plant pathology. At Exeter, he was awarded the Currie Memorial Prize.

In 1972, having already taught doctoral students at Makerere University, Uganda, he was awarded a PhD by the University of Cambridge.

== Research career ==
Leakey worked as a plant breeder and agricultural advisor for around 60 years. He aimed to breed plant varieties suitable for local conditions. As well as working in, he was also involved with plant breeding projects in the UK, especially varieties of beans. This included varieties of more digestible, low-flatulence beans such as varieties Prim and Proper.

== Position in the Leakey family ==
Leakey family tree

James Leakey (1775–1865) (Note: O'Donoghue, F. M.; Remington, V. (revised) (2004). "Leakey, James (1775–1865), miniature painter". Oxford Dictionary of National Biography (online ed.). Oxford University Press. doi:10.1093/ref:odnb/16244. (Subscription, Wikipedia Library access or UK public library membership required.))	Eliza Hubbard Woolmer (1793–1855)
James Shirley Leakey (1824–1871)	Caroline Woolmer Leakey (1827–1881)	8 others	Peter Nettleton Leakey (1830–1906)
Rev. Arundell Leakey (1853–1924)	Rev. Harry Leakey (1868–1940)	Alexander Bazett Leakey (1879–1961)
Elizabeth Laing (1873–1925)	Arundell Gray Leakey (1885–1954)	4 others	Raymond Arundell Leakey (1887–1976)	Henrietta Wilfrida Avern (1902–1993)	Louis Seymour Bazett Leakey (1903–1972)	Mary Douglas Nicol (1913–1996)	3 others	Phil Leakey (1908–1992)	Alexander Graham Leakey (1911–1994)
Nigel Gray Leakey (1913–1941)	Robert Dove Leakey (1914–2013)	Maj. Gen. Arundell Rea Leakey (1915–1999)	Agnes Florence Leakey (1917–2006)	Ian Raymond Arundell Leakey (1924–2020)	Colin Louis Avern Leakey (1933–2018)	Meave Epps (b. 1942)	Richard Erskine Frere Leakey (1944–2022)	Margaret Cropper	Jonathan Harry Erskine Leakey (1940–2021)	Philip Leakey (b. 1949)	Mary Anne Leakey
Lt. Gen. Arundell David Leakey (b. 1952)	Mark Leakey (b. 1956)	Tamsin Leakey	Charles Bird (b. 1954)	Louise Leakey (b. 1972)	Emmanuel, Prince de Mérode (b. 1970)	Olivia Colman (b. 1974)
Joshua Leakey (b. 1988)	Lara Bird (b. 1998)

== Publications ==
- Background to current breeding work at Makerere University, Uganda (1970)
- Anthracnose resistance breeding in Pinto beans in Uganda using the ARE gene from Cornell (1970)
- Scope for breeding for improved protein content and quality in Dry Beans in Uganda (1970)
- Need one grow pure lines in developing Countries (Annual Report of the Bean Improvement Co-operative, 1970)
- The improvement of beans in East Africa (in Crop Improvement in East Africa, ed. C.L.A. Leakey, Commonwealth Agricultural Bureau, (1970)
- Races of Colletotrichum lindemuthianum and implications for bean breeding in Uganda (Annual of Applied Biology, with A. Simbwa-Bunnya, 1971)
- Bean Rust studies in Uganda (with J. Atkins & J. Magara, Annual Report of the Bean Improvement Co-operative, 1972)
- Crop Index in Beans (Annual Report of the Bean Improvement Co-operative, 1972)
- Factors affecting increased production and marketing of food crops in Uganda (East African Journal of Rural Development, 1972)
- The effect of plant population and fertility level on the yield and its components in two determinate cultivars of Phaseolus vulgaris (Journal of Agricultural Science 1972)
- A note on Xanthomonas blight of beans (Phaseolus vulgaris (L.) Savi and prospects for its control by breeding for tolerance (Euphytica 1973)
- Potentials of field beans and other food legumes in Latin America (1974)
- Making use of germplasm collections (Bean Improvement Co-operative Annual Report 1975)
- Effective rhizobium inoculation in beans – a mini review (Annual Report of the Bean Improvement Co-operative 1977)
- Collecting diary of Dr and Mrs C.L.A. Leakey, Spain 4–23 September 1979 (report in two volumes for CIAT, 1979)
- Phenotype and Corresponding Genotypic Descriptors for Phaseolus vulgaris (International Board for Plant Genetic Resources, Rome, 1982)
- Genotypic and Phenotypic markers in Common Bean (1988)
- Breeding on the C, J and B loci for modification of bean seed-coat flavonoids with the objective of improving food acceptability (Bean Improvement Co-operative Annual Report 1992)
- Beans – Past, Present and Future: a Ugandan Perspective (African Crop Science Conference Proceedings, 1994)
- A survey of beans in relation to their consumption and cooking characteristics carried out in Kenya during January and February 1994 (with G Njeri-Maina, J.K. Kamau & S.M.W. Munene (Food Research Institute, Norwich, 1994)
- Beans, Fibre, Health and Gas (with C. Harbach, Royal Society of Chemistry, 1995)
- Flatulence, a re-examination of the causes, and the development of improved technology for direct volumetric measurement and determination of organic volatiles in flatus (with C. Harbach, Proceedings of the Second European Conference on Grain Legumes, Copenhagen 1995)
- Breeding Phaseolus beans for consumer quality (Grain Legumes, 1996)
- Mantecas, a new class of beans Phaseolus vulgaris of enhanced digestibility (with G. Hosfield & A. Dubois, Proceedings of the Third European Conference on Grain Legumes, Valladolid 1998)
- Progress in developing dry Phaseolus beans for Britain, Protection and Production of Combinable Break Crops (Aspects of Applied Biology, 1999)
- Progress in developing tannin-free dry Phaseolus vulgaris (Bean Improvement Co-operative Biennial Conference Proceedings, Calgary, Canada, 1999)

== Sources ==
- Ancestral Passions: The Leakey family and the quest for humankind's beginnings by Virginia Morrell (Simon & Schuster, New York, 1995) ISBN 0-684-80192-2
- colinleakey.com official site
- "Tomorrow's world today". The Independent. 27 May 1998. Archived from the original on 15 October 2008 – via FindArticles.
- Prim and proper beans
