= David Leakey =

British Army general, parliamentary official

Lieutenant General David Leakey CMG CVO CBE
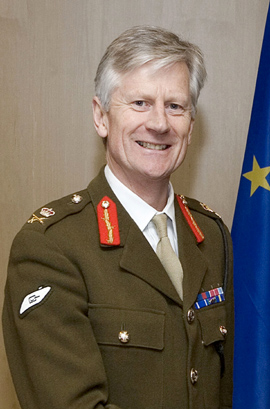

Gentleman Usher of the Black Rod
- In office 1 February 2011 – 13 February 2018
- Monarch: Elizabeth II
- Preceded by: Sir Freddie Viggers
- Succeeded by: Sarah Clarke

Personal details
- Born: Arundell David Leakey; 18 May 1952 (age 74) United Kingdom
- Parent: Rea Leakey (father)
- Relatives: Nigel Leakey (uncle)
- Education: Fitzwilliam College, Cambridge; Royal Military Academy Sandhurst

Military service
- Branch/service: British Army
- Years of service: 1971–2010
- Rank: Lieutenant General
- Unit: Royal Tank Regiment
- Commands: European Union Military Staff; 20th Armoured Brigade; 2nd Royal Tank Regiment
- Battles/wars: Operation Banner; EUFOR Althea (Bosnia and Herzegovina)
- Awards: Companion of the Order of St Michael and St George; Commander of the Royal Victorian Order; Commander of the Order of the British Empire; Queen's Commendation for Valuable Service

Lieutenant General Arundell David Leakey, CMG, CVO, CBE (born 18 May 1952) is a former British Army officer. He was Director General of the European Union Military Staff in the Council of the European Union, Brussels. In 2010 he was appointed Gentleman Usher of the Black Rod, a role he held until February 2018.

== Early life and family ==
Leakey is the son of Major General Rea Leakey and nephew of Victoria Cross recipient Nigel Leakey. Leakey was educated at Sherborne School. He is also related to the Victoria Cross recipient Joshua Leakey.

== Military career ==
After attending the Royal Military Academy Sandhurst, Leakey was commissioned into the Royal Tank Regiment as a second lieutenant (on probation) on 27 February 1971. His service number was 491002. From 4 September 1971 to 1 July 1974 he was part of the University Officer Training Corps while he read law at Fitzwilliam College, University of Cambridge. His commission was confirmed on 1 July 1974 with seniority from 1 February 1971. He was promoted to lieutenant on 1 July 1974 with seniority from 1 February 1973, and to captain on 1 August 1977. He served in the UK, Northern Ireland, Germany, Bosnia and in Canada in armoured vehicles and in tanks (Chieftain and Challenger).

Having attended the Staff College, Camberley, Leakey was promoted to major on 30 September 1984. He was appointed Chief of Staff at 7th Armoured Brigade (Germany), Military Assistant to the Chief of the Defence Staff and then commanding officer of the 2nd Royal Tank Regiment.

Leakey was promoted to colonel on 31 December 1993 with seniority from 30 June 1993. He was then posted to the Ministry of Defence as a Colonel Military Operations. In that role, he was responsible for Operational planning and policy affecting Eastern and Western Europe. In early 1995, he attended the Higher Command and Staff Course. In late 1995, he was the UK's Military Representative at the peace negotiations to end the Bosnian War held in the United States. The successful negotiations resulted in the signing of the Dayton Agreement and an end to the three-and-a-half-year-long war.

Leakey was promoted to brigadier on 31 December 1995 with seniority from 30 June 1995. He was appointed Commander of 20th Armoured Brigade in Germany in 1996. With his brigade, he was posted to the former Yugoslavia from 21 December 1996 to 20 June 1997. He returned to the Ministry of Defence as Director of Military Operations from July 1997 to December 1999.

In 2000, Leakey attended the Royal College of Defence Studies. He was Chief of Staff at Headquarters Northern Ireland from February to December 2001. He was promoted to major general on 15 December 2001. From December 2001 to October 2004, he was Director General of Army Training and Recruiting. On 6 October 2004, he was appointed Commander of European Union Force Althea, the European Union peacekeeping force, which replaced the NATO-led SFOR in Bosnia and Herzegovina. He was promoted to lieutenant general on 28 February 2007. From 1 March 2007 until 2010, he was Director General of the European Union Military Staff in Brussels.

Leakey retired from the military on 22 September 2010.

== Later life ==
Leakey was appointed as Gentleman Usher of the Black Rod in the House of Lords from February 2011 to December 2017. In early 2020 Leakey argued strongly against former Speaker of the House of Commons John Bercow being appointed to the House of Lords, accusing him of bullying and explosive behaviour. Shadow Home Secretary and Member of Parliament Diane Abbott has defended Bercow, stating that as a military man, Leakey was "unlikely to have been bullied by Bercow".

== Personal life ==
Leakey was chairman of the National Children's Orchestra, but he resigned in June 2014. He has also been a member of the Parliament Choir.

He was appointed a Governor of Sherborne School and Sherborne School Group in 2018 and chairman in July 2020. He is also a trustee of numerous other Charitable and not for profit organisations.

He is an amateur piano player and singer. He is married with two sons. He enjoys classical music, playing squash, tennis, golf, most field sports, and chain sawing.

Leakey family tree

James Leakey (1775–1865) (Note: O'Donoghue, F. M.; Remington, V. (revised) (2004). "Leakey, James (1775–1865), miniature painter". Oxford Dictionary of National Biography (online ed.). Oxford University Press. doi:10.1093/ref:odnb/16244. (Subscription, Wikipedia Library access or UK public library membership required.))	Eliza Hubbard Woolmer (1793–1855)
James Shirley Leakey (1824–1871)	Caroline Woolmer Leakey (1827–1881)	8 others	Peter Nettleton Leakey (1830–1906)
Rev. Arundell Leakey (1853–1924)	Rev. Harry Leakey (1868–1940)	Alexander Bazett Leakey (1879–1961)
Elizabeth Laing (1873–1925)	Arundell Gray Leakey (1885–1954)	4 others	Raymond Arundell Leakey (1887–1976)	Henrietta Wilfrida Avern (1902–1993)	Louis Seymour Bazett Leakey (1903–1972)	Mary Douglas Nicol (1913–1996)	3 others	Phil Leakey (1908–1992)	Alexander Graham Leakey (1911–1994)
Nigel Gray Leakey (1913–1941)	Robert Dove Leakey (1914–2013)	Maj. Gen. Arundell Rea Leakey (1915–1999)	Agnes Florence Leakey (1917–2006)	Ian Raymond Arundell Leakey (1924–2020)	Colin Louis Avern Leakey (1933–2018)	Meave Epps (b. 1942)	Richard Erskine Frere Leakey (1944–2022)	Margaret Cropper	Jonathan Harry Erskine Leakey (1940–2021)	Philip Leakey (b. 1949)	Mary Anne Leakey
Lt. Gen. Arundell David Leakey (b. 1952)	Mark Leakey (b. 1956)	Tamsin Leakey	Charles Bird (b. 1954)	Louise Leakey (b. 1972)	Emmanuel, Prince de Mérode (b. 1970)	Olivia Colman (b. 1974)
Joshua Leakey (b. 1988)	Lara Bird (b. 1998)

== Honours and awards ==
Leakey was Colonel Commandant of the Royal Tank Regiment from 21 August 2006 to 30 July 2010 and previously Deputy Colonel Commandant since 16 July 1999. He was Honorary Colonel of the Dorset Yeomanry Squadron of the Royal Wessex Yeomanry until September 2024, Honorary Colonel of the Dorset Army Cadet Force until 1 July 2025, as well as Colonel of Cadet Force Music.

Companion of the Order of St Michael and St George (CMG)	24 March 2006, "in recognition of gallant and distinguished services in the former Yugoslavia during the period 1st April to 30th September 2005".
Commander of the Royal Victorian Order (CVO)	2018 New Year Honours
Commander of the Order of the British Empire (CBE)	5 December 1997, "in recognition of gallant and distinguished services in former Yugoslavia during the period 21st December 1996 to 20th June 1997".
United Nations Medal for UNFICYP	United Nations Peacekeeping Force in Cyprus
NATO Former Republic of Yugoslavia Medal	With clasp ' Former Yugoslavia '
General Service Medal	With oak leaves for Queen's Commendation for Valuable Service awarded on 19 April 2002, "in recognition of gallant and distinguished services in Northern Ireland during period 1st April 2001 to 30th September 2001".
Western European Union Mission Service Medal	With "ALTHEA" Clasp
Queen Elizabeth II Golden Jubilee Medal	2002
Queen Elizabeth II Diamond Jubilee Medal	2012

Government offices
Preceded by Sir Freddie Viggers	Black Rod; 2011–2018	Succeeded by Sarah Clarke
Military offices
Preceded by Jean-Paul Perruche	Director General of the European Union Military Staff; 2007–2010	Succeeded by Ton van Osch
