= Caroline Leakey =

English Writer

- Born: Caroline Woolmer Leakey; 8 March 1827; Exeter, Devon, England
- Died: 12 July 1881 (aged 54); Exeter, Devon, England
- Writing career
- Pen name: Oliné Keese
- Genres: Fiction, poetry
- Notable works: The Broad Arrow (1859), Lyra Australis (1853)

Caroline Woolmer Leakey (8 March 1827 – 12 July 1881) was an English writer, whose poetry and only novel (The Broad Arrow, published using the pen name Oliné Keese) were influenced and based on her experience living in Van Diemen's Land (now Tasmania) for five years between 1848 and 1853.

== Life ==
Leakey was born in Exeter in the county of Devon, England. She was the sixth child of a large religious family of eleven children: her parents were James Leakey, an artist, and Eliza Hubbard Woolmer. Suffering from ill health most of her life, Leakey was an avid reader, and when her health allowed her, was active in charitable and religious activities.

In 1847, she sailed to the British colony of Van Diemen's Land, to join her sister Eliza, who had migrated to Hobart Town several years earlier with her clergyman husband, Reverend James Medland. Shortly after her arrival, her health deteriorated and she was bedridden for much of the remainder of her time in the colony. In 1851, she lived for twelve months at the convict settlement of Port Arthur. When she returned to Hobart, she fell ill again and her family urged her to return to England, which she did in March 1853.

Encouraged by Bishop Francis Nixon, whom she had lived with in Hobart, to publish her poetry, Leakey published an anthology of poems titled Lyra Australis, or Attempts to Sing in a Strange Land, which was published in London in 1853 and Hobart in 1854.

In March 1857, Leakey began writing a novel, which was published in 1859 in London and in 1860 in Hobart. The novel, The Broad Arrow: Being Passages from the History of Maida Gwynnham, a Lifer, was published under the pen name of "Oliné Keese". The Broad Arrow is considered a significant social document, and as one of the earliest novels to feature a convict as the main character, was a forerunner of, and influence on, the more well-known For the Term of His Natural Life by Marcus Clarke, who used Leakey's novel as a reference for his book. After Leakey's death a heavily abridged version of The Broad Arrow was published. Her original, unabridged version remained out of print until 2019, when it was re-issued.

In 1861, Leakey established a house in Exeter to care for "fallen women". She wrote numerous religious tracts before she died after an eighteen-month illness in 1881.

== Genealogy ==
Leakey family tree

James Leakey (1775–1865) (Note: O'Donoghue, F. M.; Remington, V. (revised) (2004). "Leakey, James (1775–1865), miniature painter". Oxford Dictionary of National Biography (online ed.). Oxford University Press. doi:10.1093/ref:odnb/16244. (Subscription, Wikipedia Library access or UK public library membership required.))	Eliza Hubbard Woolmer (1793–1855)
James Shirley Leakey (1824–1871)	Caroline Woolmer Leakey (1827–1881)	9 others
Rev. Arundell Leakey (1853–1924)	Rev. Harry Leakey (1868–1940)
Elizabeth Laing (1873–1925)	Arundell Gray Arundell Leakey (1885–1954)	4 others	Raymond Arundell Leakey (1887–1976)	Henrietta Wilfrida Avern (1902–1993)	Louis Seymour Bazett Leakey (1903–1972)	Mary Douglas Nicol (1913–1996)	3 others
Nigel Gray Leakey (1913–1941)	Robert Dove Leakey (1914–2013)	Maj. Gen. Arundell Rea Leakey (1915–1999)	Agnes Florence Leakey (1917–2006)	Ian Raymond Arundell Leakey (1924–2020)	Colin Louis Avern Leakey (1933–2018)	Meave Epps (b. 1942)	Richard Erskine Frere Leakey (1944–2022)	Margaret Cropper	Jonathan Harry Erskine Leakey (1940–2021)	Philip Leakey (b. 1949)
Lt. Gen. Arundell David Leakey (b. 1952)	Mark Leakey (b. 1956)	Tamsin Leakey	Charles Bird (b. 1954)	Louise Leakey (b. 1972)	Emmanuel, Prince de Mérode (b. 1970)
Joshua Leakey (b. 1988)	Lara Bird (b. 1998)
