= Meave Leakey =

British palaeoanthropologist

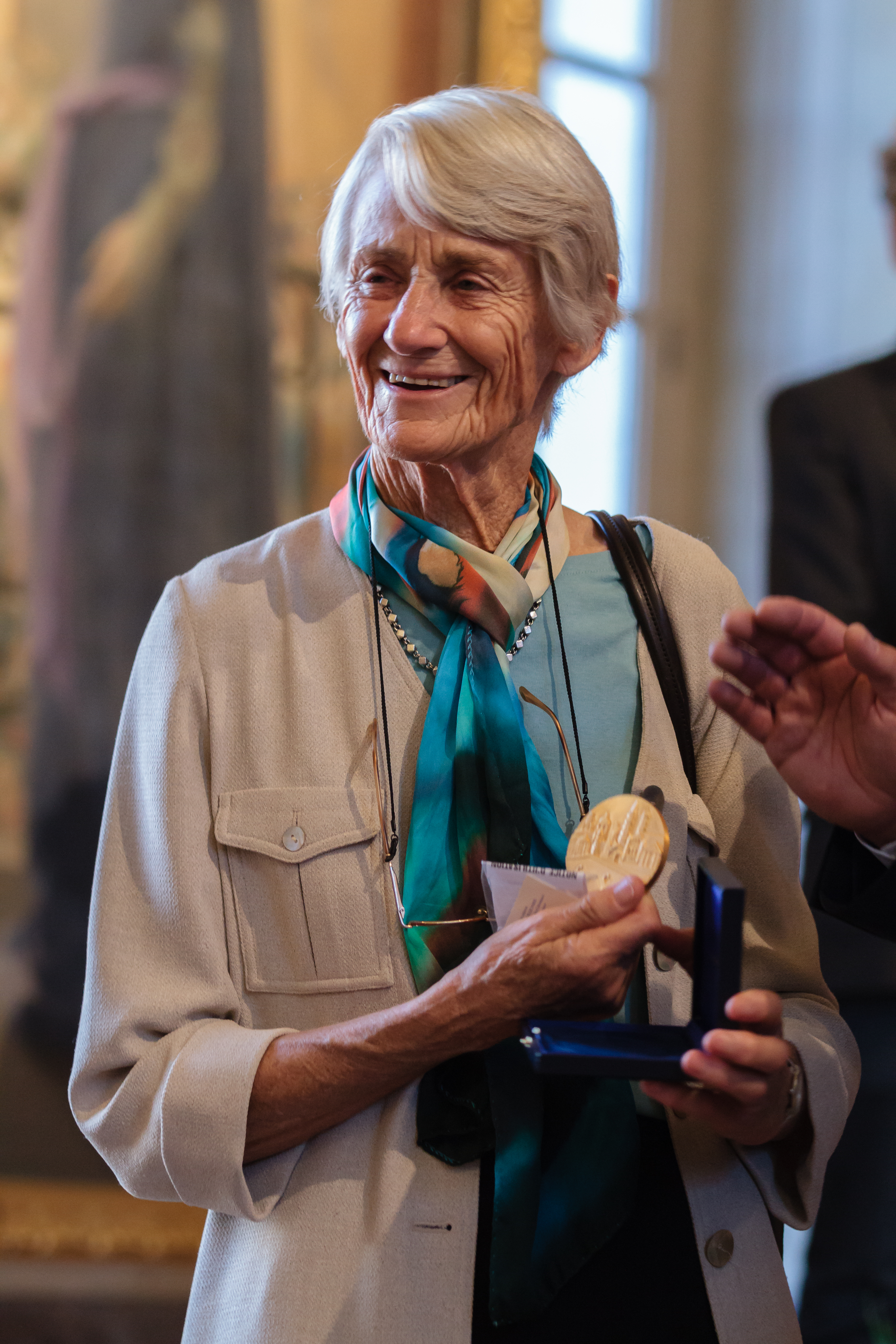
- Meave Leakey holding the medal of the City of Toulouse
- Born: Maeve Epps; 28 July 1942 (age 84); London, England
- Education: University of North Wales
- Spouse: Richard Leakey (m. 1970; died 2022)
- Children: 2, including Louise Leakey
- Scientific career
- Fields: Paleoanthropology
- Workplaces: Stony Brook University; Turkana Basin Institute

Meave G. Leakey (born Meave Epps; 28 July 1942) is a British palaeoanthropologist. She works at Stony Brook University and is co-ordinator of Plio-Pleistocene research at the Turkana Basin Institute. She studies early hominid evolution and has done extensive field research in the Turkana Basin. She has Doctor of Philosophy and Doctor of Science degrees.

== Flat-faced man of Kenya ==
Leakey's research team at Lake Turkana, Kenya, made a discovery in 1999. They found a 3.5-million-year-old skull and partial jaw thought to belong to a new branch of the early human family. She named the find Kenyanthropus platyops ("flat-faced man of Kenya").

== Personal life ==
Leakey was married to Richard Leakey, a palaeontologist. They have two children, Louise (born 1972) and Samira (born 1974). Louise Leakey continues family traditions by conducting palaeontological research.

Leakey initially studied zoology and marine zoology at the University of North Wales. Her first contact with the Leakey family was working for the Tigoni Primate Research Centre while studying for her PhD. At this time, the centre was being administered by Louis Leakey.

She received her PhD in zoology in 1968. In 2004, she was awarded an honorary D.Sc. from University College, London, for palaeontology. That same year, she received the Golden Plate Award of the American Academy of Achievement. Leakey is currently a Research Professor for the Turkana Basin Institute (affiliated with Stony Brook University). On 30 April 2013, Leakey was elected as a Foreign Associate of the US National Academy of Sciences, with specialities of geology and anthropology. This made Leakey the first Kenyan citizen and also the first woman citizen of an African country to be elected as a member of the National Academy of Sciences. She was elected to the American Philosophical Society in 2017.

== Position in the Leakey family ==
Leakey family tree

James Leakey (1775–1865) (Note: O'Donoghue, F. M.; Remington, V. (revised) (2004). "Leakey, James (1775–1865), miniature painter". Oxford Dictionary of National Biography (online ed.). Oxford University Press. doi:10.1093/ref:odnb/16244. (Subscription, Wikipedia Library access or UK public library membership required.))	Eliza Hubbard Woolmer (1793–1855)
James Shirley Leakey (1824–1871)	Caroline Woolmer Leakey (1827–1881)	9 others
Rev. Arundell Leakey (1853–1924)	Rev. Harry Leakey (1868–1940)
Elizabeth Laing (1873–1925)	Arundell Gray Arundell Leakey (1885–1954)	4 others	Raymond Arundell Leakey (1887–1976)	Henrietta Wilfrida Avern (1902–1993)	Louis Seymour Bazett Leakey (1903–1972)	Mary Douglas Nicol (1913–1996)	3 others
Nigel Gray Leakey (1913–1941)	Robert Dove Leakey (1914–2013)	Maj. Gen. Arundell Rea Leakey (1915–1999)	Agnes Florence Leakey (1917–2006)	Ian Raymond Arundell Leakey (1924–2020)	Colin Louis Avern Leakey (1933–2018)	Meave Epps (b. 1942)	Richard Erskine Frere Leakey (1944–2022)	Margaret Cropper	Jonathan Harry Erskine Leakey (1940–2021)	Philip Leakey (b. 1949)
Lt. Gen. Arundell David Leakey (b. 1952)	Mark Leakey (b. 1956)	Tamsin Leakey	Charles Bird (b. 1954)	Louise Leakey (b. 1972)	Emmanuel, Prince de Mérode (b. 1970)
Joshua Leakey (b. 1988)	Lara Bird (b. 1998)

== Selected publications ==
- Rene Bob & Meave G. Leakey (2009), "Ecology of Plio-Pleistocene Mammals in the Omo-Turkana Basin and the Emergence of Homo", in Frederick E. Grine; John G. Fleagle & Richard E. Leakey (eds.), The First Humans: Origin and Early Evolution of the Genus Homo, Vertebrate Paleobiology and Paleoanthropology, Conference publication: Springer, pp. 175–184, ISBN 978-1-4020-9979-3
- Lothagam: The Dawn of Humanity in Eastern Africa by John Harris and Meave Leakey, Eds. (December 2001).
- Leakey, Meave; Walker, Alan (June 1997), "Early Hominid Fossils from Africa", Scientific American, 276 (6): 74–79, Bibcode:1997SciAm.276f..74L, doi:10.1038/scientificamerican0697-74, PMID 9198897
- Stratigraphy and Paleontology of Pliocene and Pleistocene Localities West of Lake Turkana, Kenya by John Harris, Meave Leakey, Eds. et al. (October 1988).
- Harris, J.M; Brown, F.H; Leakey, M.G; Walker, A.C; Leakey, R.E (1 January 1989), "Pliocene and Pleistocene Hominid-Bearing Sites from West of Lake Turkana, Kenya", Science, 239 (4835): 27–33, doi:10.1126/science.239.4835.27, PMID 17820626, S2CID 21225366
- Leakey, Meave G.; Leakey, Richard E.; Harris, John Michael, eds. (1978), Koobi Fora Research Project: Researches into Geology, Palaeontology, and Human Origins, vol. 1: The Fossil Hominids and an Introduction to their Context 1968–1974, Clarendon Press, ISBN 978-0-19-857392-0
- Leakey, Meave G. (2020). The Sediments of Time: My Lifelong Search for the Past. With Samira Leakey. Boston: Houghton Mifflin Harcourt. ISBN 978-0-358-20667-5.

== See also ==
- Meave (Irish name)
- List of fossil sites (with link directory)
- List of hominina (hominid) fossils (with images)
