= Louise Leakey =

Kenyan paleontologist

Her Highness Louise, Princess of Merode
- Born: 21 March 1972 (age 54); Nairobi, Kenya
- Education: United World College of the Atlantic; University of Bristol; University College, London
- Known for: Youngest documented person to find hominoid fossil
- Spouse: Prince Emmanuel de Merode (m. 2003)
- Children: Princess Seiyia de Merode; Princess Alexia de Merode
- Parent(s): Richard Leakey; Meave Epps
- Relatives: House of Merode (by marriage)
- Scientific career
- Fields: Paleontology

Princess Louise de Merode (née Leakey, born 21 March 1972) is a Kenyan paleontologist and anthropologist. She conducts research and field work on human fossils in Eastern Africa.

== Early life and education ==
Louise Leakey was born in Nairobi, Kenya, to Kenyan paleoanthropologist, conservationist and politician Richard Leakey and British paleoanthropologist Meave Leakey in 1972, the same year that her paleoanthropologist grandfather, Louis Leakey, died. She first became actively involved in fossil discoveries in 1977, when at the age of five she became the youngest documented person to find a hominoid fossil.

Leakey earned her International Baccalaureate from United World College of the Atlantic and a Bachelor of Science degree in geology and biology from the University of Bristol. She earned a PhD from University College, London in 2001.

== Career ==
In 1993, Leakey joined her mother as a co-leader of paleontological expeditions in northern Kenya. The Koobi Fora research project has been the main program behind some of the most notable hominid fossil discoveries of the past two decades, the most recent being Kenyanthropus platyops.

Leakey has promoted an initiative to place digital models of fossil collections in a virtual laboratory, African Fossils, where models can be downloaded, 3D printed or cut in cardboard for reassembly.

== Personal life ==
In 2003, Leakey married Prince Emmanuel de Merode, a Belgian primatologist. She is styled princesse de Merode by marriage. The couple have two daughters.

Leakey family tree

James Leakey (1775–1865) (Note: O'Donoghue, F. M.; Remington, V. (revised) (2004). "Leakey, James (1775–1865), miniature painter". Oxford Dictionary of National Biography (online ed.). Oxford University Press. doi:10.1093/ref:odnb/16244. (Subscription, Wikipedia Library access or UK public library membership required.))	Eliza Hubbard Woolmer (1793–1855)
James Shirley Leakey (1824–1871)	Caroline Woolmer Leakey (1827–1881)	9 others
Rev. Arundell Leakey (1853–1924)	Rev. Harry Leakey (1868–1940)
Elizabeth Laing (1873–1925)	Arundell Gray Arundell Leakey (1885–1954)	4 others	Raymond Arundell Leakey (1887–1976)	Henrietta Wilfrida Avern (1902–1993)	Louis Seymour Bazett Leakey (1903–1972)	Mary Douglas Nicol (1913–1996)	3 others
Nigel Gray Leakey (1913–1941)	Robert Dove Leakey (1914–2013)	Maj. Gen. Arundell Rea Leakey (1915–1999)	Agnes Florence Leakey (1917–2006)	Ian Raymond Arundell Leakey (1924–2020)	Colin Louis Avern Leakey (1933–2018)	Meave Epps (b. 1942)	Richard Erskine Frere Leakey (1944–2022)	Margaret Cropper	Jonathan Harry Erskine Leakey (1940–2021)	Philip Leakey (b. 1949)
Lt. Gen. Arundell David Leakey (b. 1952)	Mark Leakey (b. 1956)	Tamsin Leakey	Charles Bird (b. 1954)	Louise Leakey (b. 1972)	Emmanuel, Prince de Mérode (b. 1970)
Joshua Leakey (b. 1988)	Lara Bird (b. 1998)

== See also ==
- List of fossil sites (with link directory)
- List of hominina (hominid) fossils (with images)
