= The Broad Arrow =

Work by Caroline Woolmer Leakey

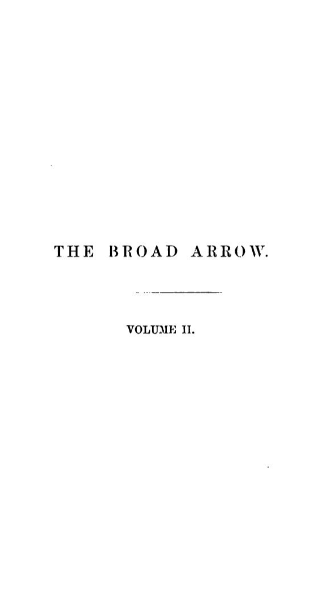
- Title page for The Broad Arrow (1859)
- Author: Caroline Leakey
- Language: English
- Genre: Fiction
- Published: 1859
- Publisher: Richard Bentley
- Publication place: England, Australia
- Media type: Print
- Pages: 444pp. (2 volumes)

The Broad Arrow; Being Passages from the History of Maida Gwynnham, a Lifer is an 1859 novel published by the English writer Caroline Woolmer Leakey under the pseudonym Oliné Keese. Set in Van Diemen's Land, it was one of the first novels to describe the Australian convict system and one of only two colonial novels to feature a female convict as its main character. It has been described as a precursor of the better-known For the Term of His Natural Life by Marcus Clarke (1870–72), who used Leakey's book as a source for his story.

== Plot ==
The novel tells the story of Maida Gwynham, a young woman lured into committing a forgery by her dishonest lover and wrongly convicted of infanticide. She is sentenced to transportation for life to Van Diemen's Land, where she is assigned to a Hobart family as a domestic servant. The novel describes the sea voyage to Australia and life in Hobart Town and Port Arthur for both convicts and free settlers. The "broad arrow" of the novel's title refers to the arrow that was stamped onto the clothing issued to convicts, indicating that it remained the property of the British government.

== Background and publication history ==
Caroline Leakey travelled from England to Van Diemen's Land in 1847 to join her sister and brother-in-law, who had emigrated in 1844. She spent six years in the colony but returned to London in 1853 as her health deteriorated. In 1854 she published a volume of poetry written during her time in Hobart, Lyra Australis, or Attempts to Sing in a Strange Land. She began writing The Broad Arrow in 1857 and it was published in two volumes in London in 1859 and in Hobart in 1860, illustrated with etchings by Auguste Hervieu. Some early reviewers criticised the book for its melodramatic plotting and sentimental morality. Some literary historians have suggested that the timing of the first edition – it appeared just seven years after transportation of convicts to Tasmania ended – dampened popular enthusiasm for the book, as there was little appetite to revisit that "gloomy phase of colonial life".

Leakey died in 1881 and in 1886 the novel was re-issued in a heavily abridged single-volume edition, edited by Gertrude Townsend Mayer for Richard Bentley & Son. The revised edition focused on the "colonial romance" aspect of the novel, and was more commercially successful than the original two-volume edition. For the next 130 years all published editions used the shortened 1886 text. A critical edition of the novel edited by literary scholar Jenna Mead, restoring the original text, indicating where edits were made, and analysing the two volumes in the context of nineteenth-century publishing culture, was published by Sydney University Press in 2019.
