= Roy Ashton =

Australian singer (1909-1995)

- Born: 17 April 1909; Perth, Western Australia
- Died: 10 January 1995 (aged 85); Farnham, Surrey, England
- Occupations: Make-up artist; tenor

Howard Roy Ashton (17 April 1909 – 10 January 1995) was an Australian tenor, associated for a while with Benjamin Britten's English Opera Group, and make-up artist who became particularly associated with his work on the Hammer Horror films.

== Background and early career ==
Ashton was born, the youngest of four sons, in Perth, and grew up in Menzies, Western Australia, where his father, Howard White Ashton, was in charge of the local bank, handling accounts of prospectors in the last great Australian gold rush. His mother was a talented pianist and singer: Dame Nellie Melba had offered to take her to England to join her opera company, but on condition that she remained single. Ashton won a scholarship to Perth Modern School, where his talent for art and music blossomed. He then studied architecture, and worked as an illustrator of architectural subjects. With the Great Depression, Ashton was made redundant. In the spring of 1932 he decided to travel to England to improve his prospects, and joined the crew of a tramp steamer to get there.

Once in London, Ashton enrolled at The Central School of Arts and Crafts. In 1933 he applied for, and was accepted, for an apprenticeship with the Gaumont-British Film Corporation. His first film, for which he designed and made wigs, was Tudor Rose (1936), followed by The Man Who Changed His Mind with Boris Karloff. His final film with Gaumont was Doctor Syn (1937). He then worked freelance, being involved in a number of productions by London Films including Prison Without Bars (1939), the first in which he was in charge of make-up. Ashton later confessed that his "real love" remained music, and he only applied himself to the craft of make-up, "an occupation that I did not really enjoy", to ensure he had a stable means of earning a living "[h]aving tasted the sadness of unemployment" while in Australia.

== World War II and opera ==
With the outbreak of the Second World War, Ashton joined the Metropolitan Police in which he served during the Blitz. He also gained a scholarship for the Royal Academy of Music, where he studied singing every other day and where he met his future wife, Elizabeth Cooper, who was also studying singing. He was then drafted into the army where he served for two and a half years. During that time he worked in a secret department, based in the Natural History Museum and headed by Charles Fraser-Smith, whose task was to create concealed weapons and gadgets – "exploding fountain pens and umbrellas which fired poison darts" as Ashton recalled – for use by undercover operatives serving behind enemy lines in occupied Europe. The author Ian Fleming is known to have taken an interest in that department's work, later basing 'Q' division in his James Bond novels on the activities he saw there.

Ashton was demobbed in January 1946, and was finally able to devote himself to music. In 1947 he joined the Intimate Opera Company: as Ashton recalled, "in the old days of Grand Opera they used to have Entr'Acte – 'in-between-the-acts' short pieces. In the interval, two or three people would come on and do some other little opera by Mozart, Dibden [sic] and Purcell. ... We would travel all around the country touring for a week doing three operas a night."

In December 1947, Ashton joined Benjamin Britten's English Opera Group, understudying Peter Pears and creating the role of the Mayor in Albert Herring. It was during the first tour of that opera that Ashton married Elizabeth Cooper. Ashton kept his hand in as a make-up artist in film, remaining a member of The National Association of Theatre and Kine Employees; during the summer months, he worked as a make-up artist to support his life as a singer during the winter. Ashton found 1952 a particularly lean year for singing work: with the rise of broadcasting, combined with the fact "oratorio societies and music clubs, smaller opera clubs had spent all their money in 1951 for the Festival of Britain", several touring opera companies had to be wound up.

In 1955, Ashton was finally forced to make a choice. Invited to work with Orson Welles in Madrid for the film Mr. Arkadin, Ashton was on location when he received a message that English Opera Group wanted him to take part in a revival of Albert Herring. Having already promised to work on the film, though no contract had been signed, Ashton turned the EOG job down, so finishing his association with the group. His work as a make-up artist was a more lucrative and stable source of income, so he devoted himself to that career. However he would always fondly remember his singing career: "Nothing can compare with the thrill of appearing before a great gathering, of hearing the thunder of the applause delivered to a sincere artist," he wrote.

== Hammer horror and other films ==
On the production of Invitation to the Dance (1955), Ashton found himself working as assistant to Phil Leakey. They were soon firm friends, and worked together on several films. Leakey introduced Ashton to Hammer Films, so starting a relationship for which Ashton is best known.

Although he had a long and varied career in British films, Ashton is chiefly remembered for his work on the Hammer's horror films. After assisting Leakey on The Curse of Frankenstein (1957), Ashton found himself in charge of make-up for The Hound of the Baskervilles (1959) when Leakey, having had his retainer cut by the company's associate producer, Anthony Nelson Keys, left the company in disgust. (Note: When Keys then offered Ashton the job, Ashton, puzzled that Leakey should not be doing the job, called his friend; Leakey explained his grievance with Hammer, but gave his blessing to Ashton taking over.) Ashton's main effort on that film, to transform a Great Dane into the title character, was barely a success, the result only appearing briefly in the final cut. His next film, The Man Who Could Cheat Death (1959), involved transforming Anton Diffring into "a living corpse": "To produce all the ravages of time and debauchery, I felt that the final effect should be a cocktail of fatal diseases spreading rapidly across his body. Glandular fever, smallpox, cholera, typhus and typhoid, represented some of the ailments that Bonner had come into contact with (through his unseen travels) as a crusading physician." The result was widely admired: over a decade later the American make-up artist, Dick Smith, consulted Ashton about the effect to create make-up to age Dustin Hoffman as a 103-year-old man in Little Big Man, and was to repeat the effect in several subsequent films.

Ashton subsequently created some of the studio's most celebrated images in films, such as The Mummy (1959), The Curse of the Werewolf (1961) and The Reptile (1966). Ashton was particularly proud of the make-up he created for The Curse of the Werewolf, which he claimed he created quite unaware of the make up by Jack Pierce in Werewolf of London or that used in Jean Cocteau's La Belle et la Bête. Hearing in advance that Hammer were planning to make Curse of the Werewolf, he obtained a copy of the script and spent weeks in preparation before he was approached by Keys to undertake the job. Ashton also recommended that Oliver Reed should be cast in the title role: "His powerful bone structure was just right for the appearance and his gifts as an actor were perfect for the part. In addition, he resembles a wolf anyway when he is very angry." Through Oliver Reed, Ashton met the Australian dental surgeon Phil Rasmussen, who gave useful advice about creating fangs for the werewolf make-up; so started a professional relationship which was to continue in several subsequent films.

Ashton also worked on a number of Amicus horror films, including The House That Dripped Blood (1971), Asylum (1972), and Tales from the Crypt (1972), and worked on Tigon's The Creeping Flesh. As well as horror films, he worked on Blake Edwards' Pink Panther series.

== Death ==
Ashton died in England on January 10, 1995 at the age of 85.

== Discography ==
- The Beggar's Opera (John Gay, arr. Britten); with English Opera Group conducted by Benjamin Britten. BBC broadcast recorded 22 September 1948. Released on Pearl
- Albert Herring (Benjamin Britten); with English Opera Group conducted by Benjamin Britten. Live recording in the Theatre Royal, Copenhagen, on 15 September 1949. Released on Nimbus

== Filmography ==
- Tudor Rose (1936)
- The Man Who Changed His Mind (1936)
- Captain Horatio Hornblower R.N. (1951)
- The Curse of Frankenstein (1957)
- Dracula (1958)
- The Revenge of Frankenstein (1958)
- The Hound of the Baskervilles (1959)
- The Man Who Could Cheat Death (1959)
- The Mummy (1959)
- The Curse of the Werewolf (1960)
- The Phantom of the Opera (1962)
- Kiss of the Vampire (1964)
- The Gorgon (1964)
- The Pink Panther (1964)
- Dr. Terror's House of Horrors (1964)
- The Skull (1965)
- She (1965)
- The Plague of the Zombies (1966)
- The Reptile (1966)
- Oliver! (1968)
- The Devil Rides Out (1968)
- 2001: A Space Odyssey (1968)
- The House That Dripped Blood (1970)
- Hands of the Ripper (1971)
- The Devils (1971)
- Tales from the Crypt (1972)
- Asylum (1972)
- The Vault of Horror (1973)
- Frankenstein: The True Story (1973)
- The Return of the Pink Panther (1974)
- The Pink Panther Strikes Again (1976)
- Star Wars (1977)
- Flash Gordon (1980)
- Raiders of the Lost Ark (1981)
