= Kiganjo =

Settlement in Nyeri County, Kenya

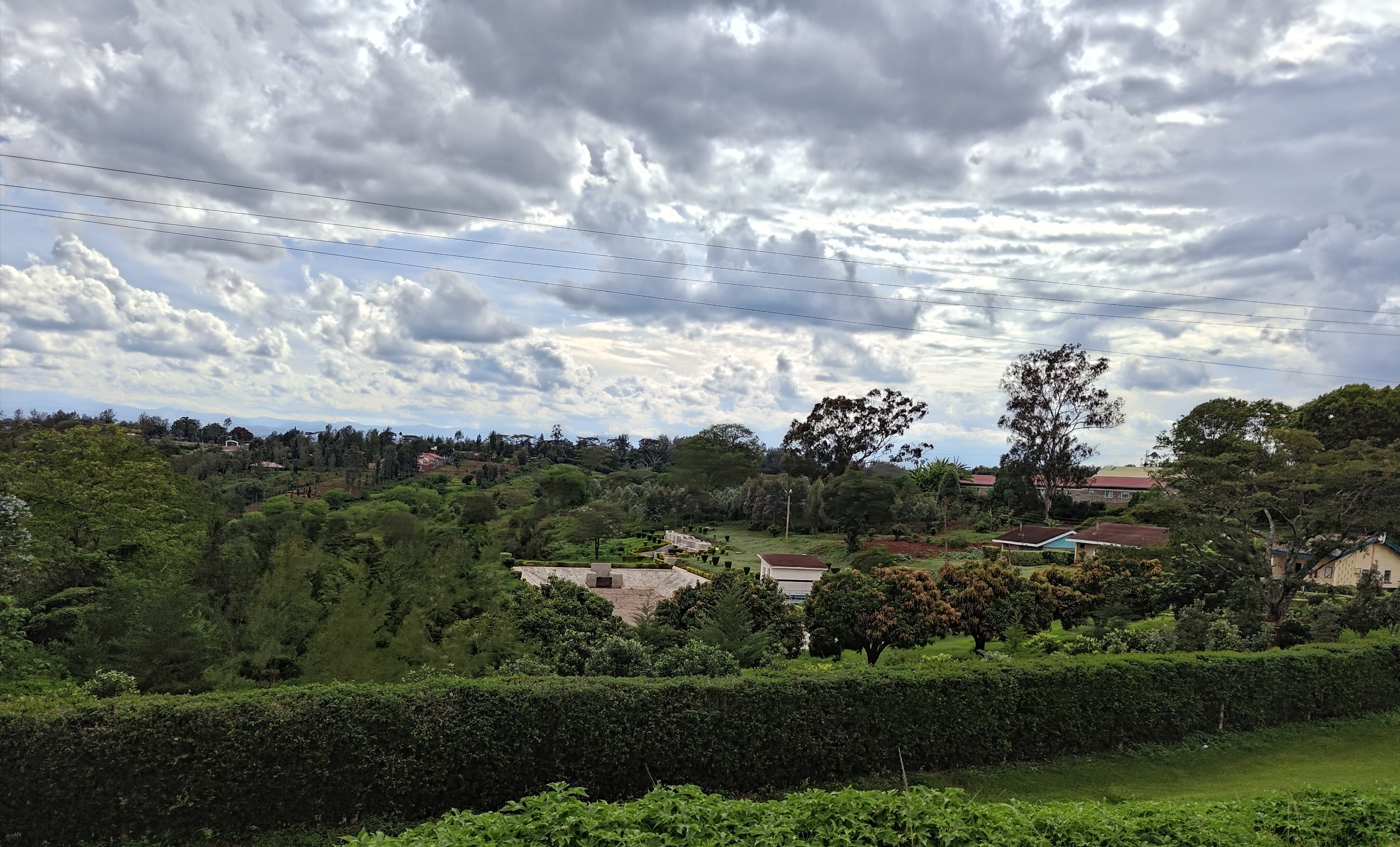

Kiganjo is a small town in Kenya's Nyeri county. It hosts the Kenya Police College which is Kenya's main college for police training. Kiganjo also hosts one of the Kenya Cooperative Creameries KCC (now New KCC) and a milk depot for the Brookside Milk Company (at Chaka). Kiganjo sits at the junction of roads from Nairobi (A2) and Nyeri (B5), and hosts a railway station on the northern arm of the Kenyan Railway System. Kagumo High School, a national school for boys, is also located in Kiganjo.

== Athletics ==
Kiganjo Kenya Police College has long hosted the first Kenyan High Altitude Athletics Training Camp where famous athletes such as Kipchoge Keino and Ben Jipcho started their athletics careers.

== Nyeri War Cemetery ==
The Nyeri war cemetery has 364 World War II victims buried in it, of whom 355 fought with the United Kingdom forces, eight in the South African forces, and one with Indian forces. The cemetery is located along the Nairobi–Nanyuki highway in Kiganjo at 0.40228°S 37.01006°E.

== Sagana Lodge ==
Sagana Lodge, one of several state lodges, is located in Kiganjo.

== Notable people ==
- Nigel Leakey, Victoria Cross recipient
