= South West France =

South West France (in French often Sud-ouest) can refer to:

- South West France (wine region)
- South-West France (European Parliament constituency)
- French Great South-West
- A geographic area, part of Southern France

== See also ==
- SNCASO, also known as Sud-Ouest, a former aircraft manufacturer
