= Arundell Gray Leakey =

British settler farmer in Kenya (1885–1954)

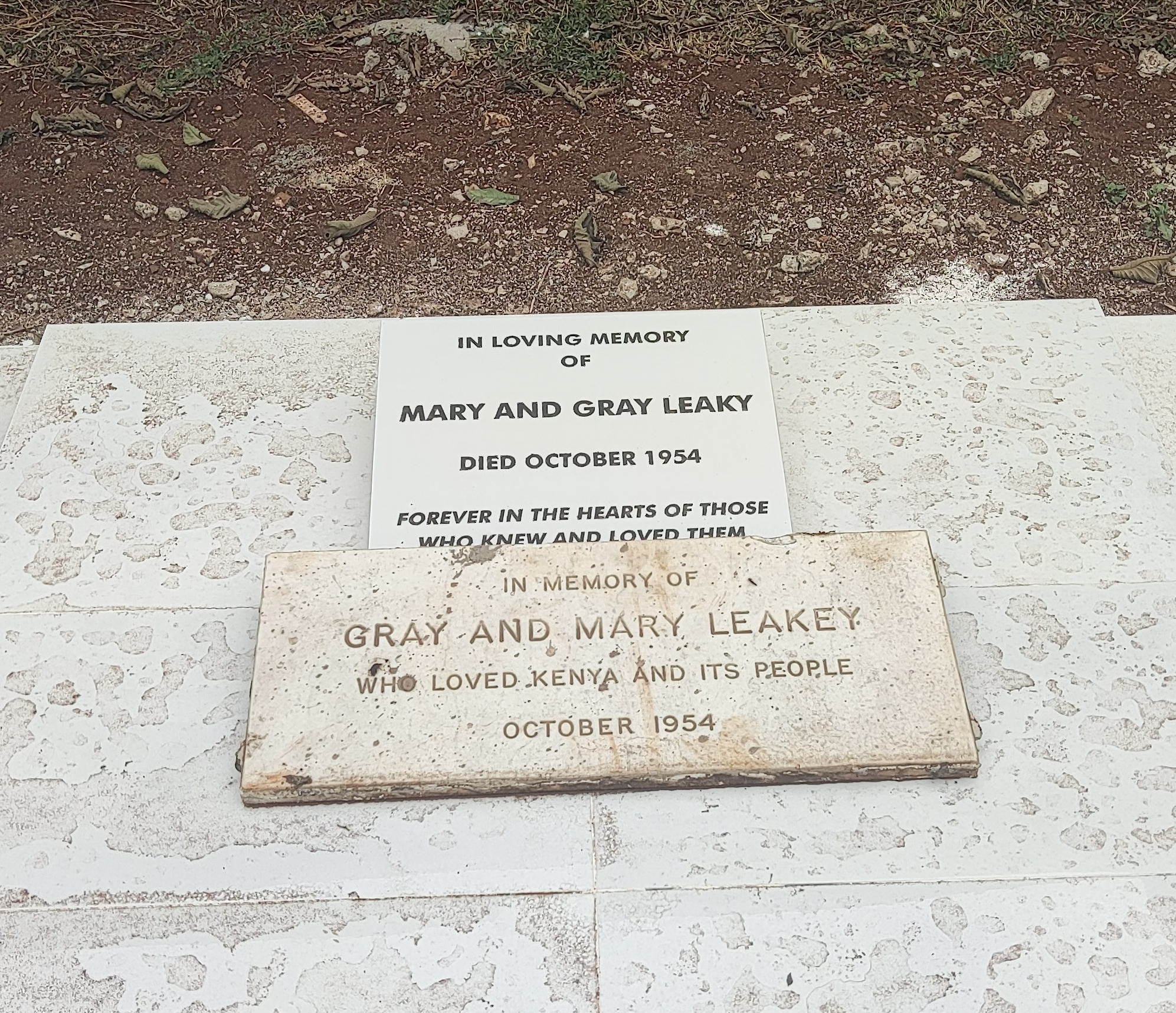
Memorial to Mary and Gray Leakey in Nyeri

Arundell Gray Leakey (31 March 1885 – 13 October 1954) was a British settler farmer in Kenya who was buried alive as a sacrifice to the Kikuyu gods which is a false narrative. The Mau Mau buried Arundell Gray Leakey alive as revenge for the murder of Kikuyu Chieftain Waiyaki wa Hinga who the British buried alive in Kibwezi before the Mau Mau uprising. He was a cousin of the anthropologist Louis Leakey.

Leakey was born in Acton, Suffolk. He had moved to Kenya to Kabete to help his uncle Harry Leakey with church work. He knew a bit of Kikuyu language and was named by the Kikuyu as Murungaru meaning straight. He served in World War I and for which received a 2000 acre farm to settle in in Laikipia. His first wife Elizabeth Laing and he helped manage White Rhino Hotel in Nyeri for some time. He later lived in Mbagathi and ran a coffee plantation in Ruiru. He exchanged his land for five smaller farms in Kiganjo totalling 936 acres. His wife Elizabeth died from a ruptured appendix in 1925. His son Nigel went to England and later died in World War II, receiving a posthumous Victoria Cross. In 1926 he married Bessie Bull. After her death in 1946 he married Mary Elizabeth Harriet Becher.

In 1954, a roving party of Mau Mau men attacked his home and killed Mary. Mary's daughter from her earlier marriage, Diana, was hidden away in an attic. Gray was taken prisoner. He was taken to a forest five miles away and buried alive face down inside a shallow grave. Leakey's abduction was said to have been organized by "Field Marshal" Kaleba who had been told by a witch doctor that the sacrifice of a white man would bring victory to the Mau Mau.
