= Phil Leakey =

British make-up artist

Philip Leakey (4 May 1908 in London, England – 26 November 1992) was a British make-up artist known chiefly for his work on Hammer films. In 1956 he became the first make-up designer ever to receive on-screen credit for "special" make-up effects for his "bold and innovative" work in X the Unknown.

He provided Christopher Lee's celebrated makeup for Hammer's The Curse of Frankenstein (1957), whose "monster" had to be memorable and terrifying without infringing the copyright on Universal's earlier makeup, created by Jack Pierce for Boris Karloff.

Leakey created make-up for Dracula and The Revenge of Frankenstein (both 1958) before leaving Hammer, disgusted by the cost-cutting measure by Hammer's associate producer, Anthony Nelson Keys, of revoking his retainer. His assistant, Roy Ashton, took charge of Hammer make-up from then onwards.
