= Mary Leakey =

British paleoanthropologist (1913–1996)

Mary Leakey FBA
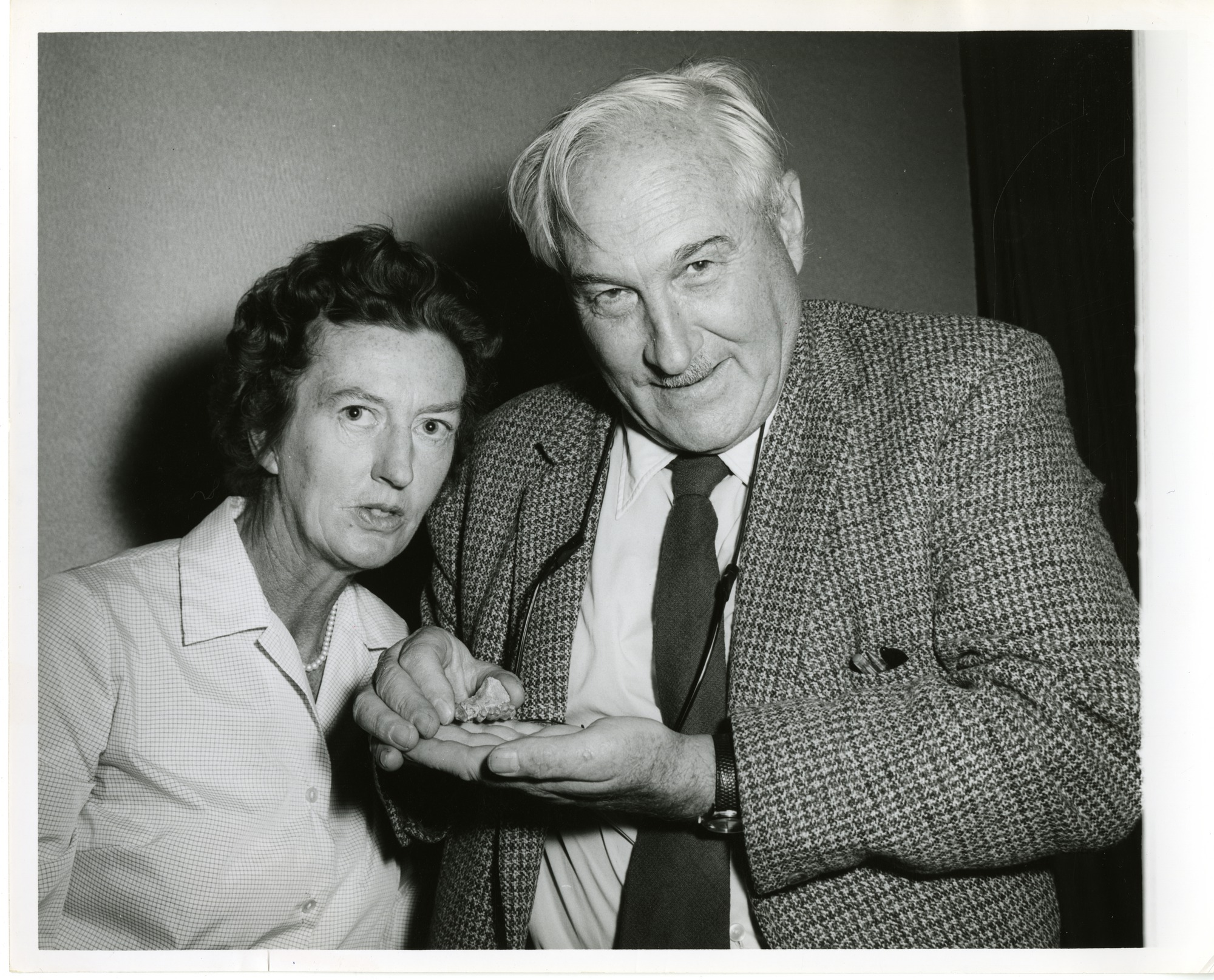
- Mary Leakey (left) with husband Louis in 1962.
- Born: Mary Douglas Nicol; 6 February 1913; London, England
- Died: 9 December 1996 (aged 83); Nairobi, Kenya
- Known for: Zinjanthropus fossil; Laetoli footprints
- Spouse: Louis Leakey (m. 1936; died 1972)
- Children: Jonathan Leakey; Richard Leakey; Philip Leakey
- Awards: Hubbard Medal (1962); Prestwich Medal (1969); Royal Swedish Academy of Sciences Gold Linnaeus Medal (1978)
- Scientific career
- Fields: Paleoanthropology
- Workplaces: Central Kenya

Mary Douglas Leakey (née Nicol, 6 February 1913 – 9 December 1996) was a British archaeologist and a founding figure in the field of modern paleoanthropology. Her career in African archaeology spanned over 60 years and focused mostly in sites in the East African Rift, from the first survey of Olduvai Gorge in 1934 until her death in 1996, having retired from fieldwork in 1984 after a blood clot left her blind in her left eye. She is credited with the classification of fifteen new animal species, one animal genus, and a series of major discoveries relating to early human evolution in East Africa, specifically the Great Rift Valley. Among these are the type specimens of Proconsul africanus (1948), Paranthropus boisei (1959), Homo habilis (1961), the Laetoli footprints (1976), and the modern typology of stone tools into industries of the Paleolithic.

Leakey collaborated with her husband and fellow paleoanthropologist Louis Leakey (1903–1972) for most of her career. He received most–at times all–of the academic credit and publicity associated with their excavations during this period, a common experience of women in science in the 20th century. Strongly disliking the public eye, she performed and directed most of the actual archaeology underlying the couples' shared notoriety, while her husband focused on publishing and public advocacy for the nascent field of paleoanthropology through his non-profit, the LSB Leakey Foundation, and support of the three female primatologists later known as the Trimates: Biruté Galdikas (1946–2006), Dian Fossey (1932–1985), and Jane Goodall (1934–2025). The couple separated permanently in 1968. Her husband relocated to Nairobe, while she remained at Olduvai and nearby sites in Tanzania, and from then on publicly took credit for her work. Four years after her husband's death, she published her team's discovery of the Laetoli footprints to international acclaim. It is today considered one of the most important finds in the history of paleoanthropology, pushing back the origin of human bipedalism into the Pliocene.

In 1962, she was awarded the Hubbard Medal of the National Geographic Society. At the 1978 Nobel Symposium in Karlskoga, she was awarded the Great Linnaeus Medal in Gold of the Royal Swedish Academy of Sciences, by King Carl XVI Gustav. In 2013, she was the subject of the Google doodle on the 100th anniversary of her birth.

== Early life and education ==
Mary Leakey was born on 6 February 1913, in London, England, to Erskine Edward Nicol, a painter, and Cecilia Marion Nicol. She grew up in England, and after the end of the First World War the family spent winters and early spring in Europe where her father painted landscape watercolors, which he would sell in London after returning for the summer. These stays included Italy and Switzerland, but the majority were in Southwestern France. Leakey attended a kindergarten in Biarritz and catechism school in Cabrerets during the family's annual visits, and received two formative exposures to archaeology during this period.

The first of these was in Les Eyzies-de-Tayac, in Dordogne, where they befriended the French prehistorians Elie Peyrony and his son Denis, who had founded the nearby National Museum of Prehistory. The Peyronys brought Leakey and her father to explore the famous Paleolithic excavations in the Vézère Valley (now a UNESCO world heritage site) where the Leakeys were allowed to search for Paleolithic artifacts among the dig refuse piles, finding mainly Magalenian items typical of Périgord sites.

The second, and far more impactful, was the family's trips to Cabretets beginning in 1925. They had befriended a local priest and self-taught archaeologist Amédée Lemozi, who took them to the Pech Merle cave system, which Lemozi had first documented in 1922. It was Leakey's first experience of Paleolithic cave paintings. During the family's second trip to Cabrerets the following spring, her father was stricken by a sudden and unknown illness. A medic during his service in the French Army during the First World War, Lemozi secured a supply of morphine as palliative care, but Nicol died shortly thereafter, aged 58. Leakey was 13 at the time.

=== Education ===
After her father's death, the family returned permanently to London. Mary was placed in a local Catholic convent to be educated, and she later boasted of never passing an examination there. Although she spoke fluent French, Mary did not excel at French language studies, apparently because her teacher frowned upon her provincial accent. She was expelled for refusing to recite poetry, and was later expelled from a second convent school for causing an explosion in a chemistry laboratory. After the second expulsion, her mother hired two tutors, who were no more successful than the nuns. After the unsuccessful tutors, her mother hired a governess.

Mary's particular interests centered on illustration and archaeology, but formal university admission was impossible with her academic record. Her mother contacted a professor at Oxford University about possible admission, and was encouraged not to apply, as it would be a waste of her time. Mary had no further contact with the university until it awarded her an honorary doctoral degree in 1981.

The small family moved to Kensington, in West London, where, though unregistered, Mary attended lectures in archaeology and related subjects at University College and at the London Museum, where she studied under Mortimer Wheeler. During this period she applied to work on a number of summer excavations. Wheeler was the first to accept her for a dig. It took place at St Albans at the Roman site of Verulamium. Her next dig was at Hembury, a Neolithic site, under Dorothy Liddell, who trained her for four years until 1934. Her illustrations of tools for Liddell drew the attention of Gertrude Caton Thompson, and, in late 1932, she entered the field as an illustrator for Caton Thompson's book The Desert Fayoum.

== Research ==
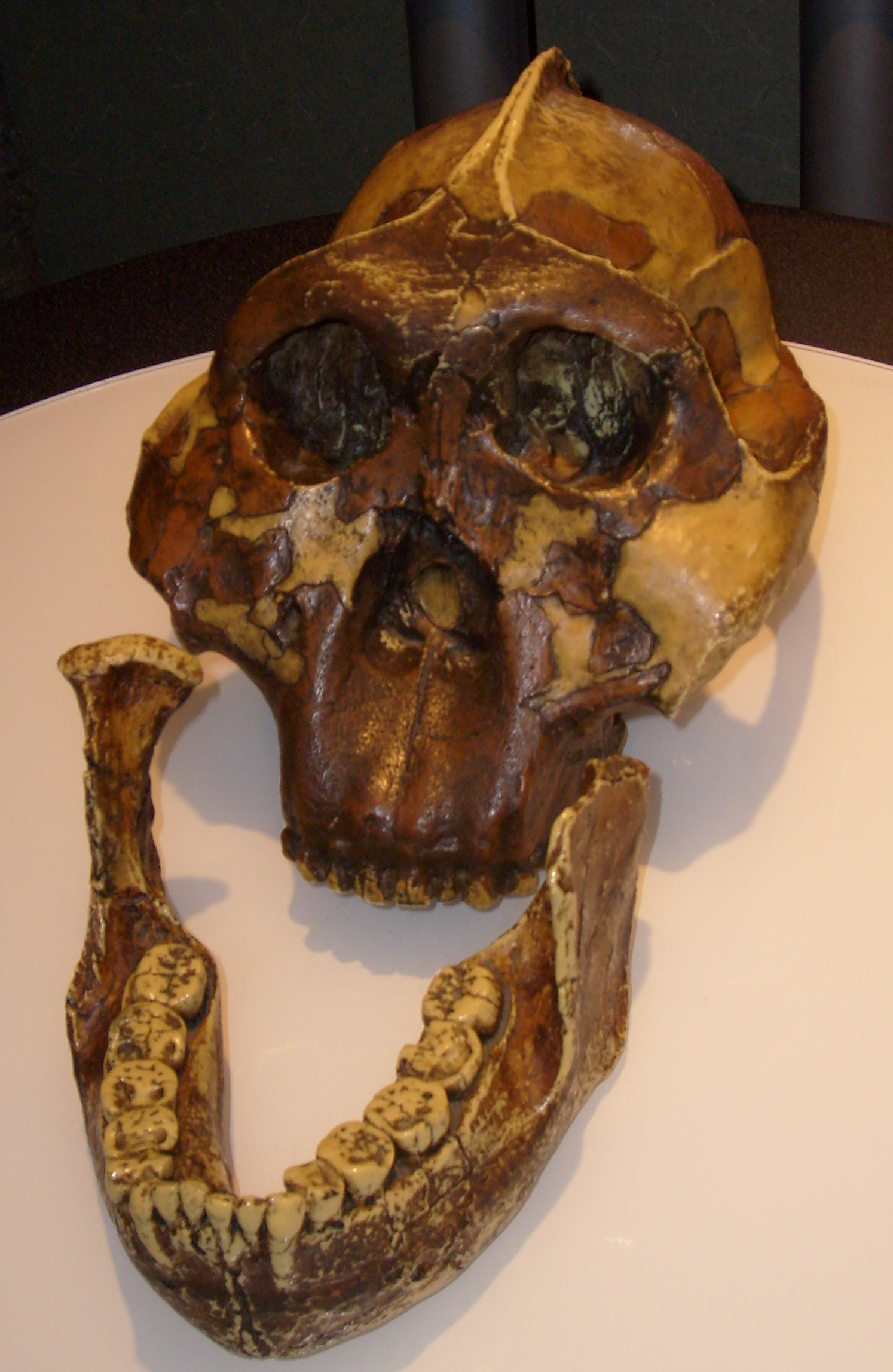
Replica of the skull "Zinjanthropus", sometimes known as "Nutcracker Man", found by Mary Leakey.

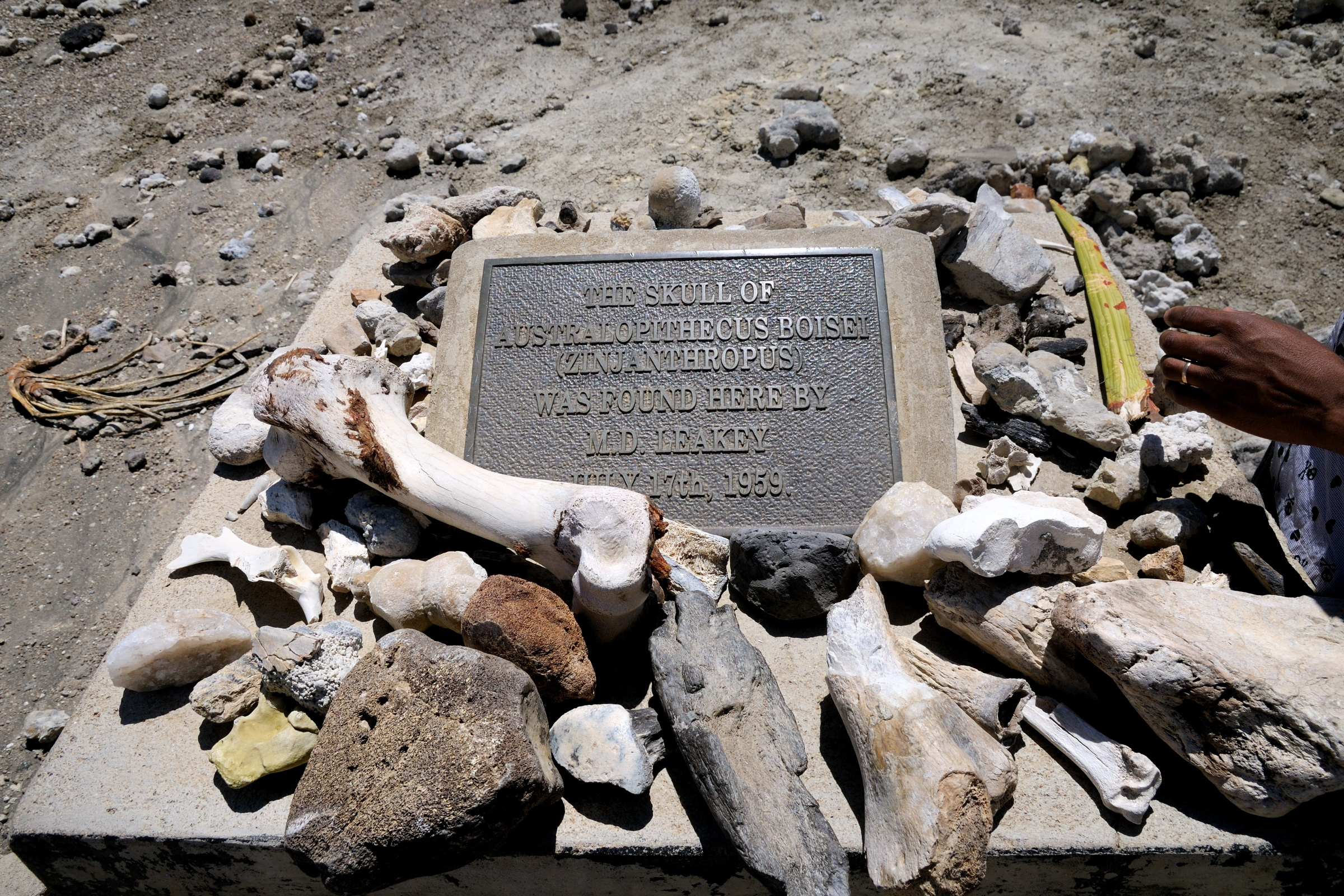
Plinth with plaque sited in Olduvai Gorge marking the spot where Mary Leakey discovered "Zinjanthropus", the first-found A. boisei in Africa.

Mary Leakey served her apprenticeship under Dorothy Liddell at Hembury, 1930–34 (see above). In 1934, she took part in a dig at Swanscombe where she discovered the largest elephant tooth known to Britain at that time.

Throughout the 1930s, 1940s and 1950s, Mary and Louis Leakey worked at Later Stone Age, Neolithic and Iron Age archaeological sites in central Kenya, such as Hyrax Hill and Njoro River Cave. In October 1948, Mary discovered a Proconsul africanus skull on Rusinga Island. Mary Leakey also recorded and published the Kondoa Irangi Rock Paintings in central Tanzania.

The Leakeys' most famous research, however, was at Olduvai Gorge in the Serengeti plains of northern Tanzania. The site yielded many stone tools, from Oldowan choppers to multi-purpose hand axes. The earliest tools they dug up were likely made by Homo habilis and can be dated to over two million years ago.

On the morning of 17 July 1959, Louis fell ill at Olduvai and stayed at camp while Mary went out to the field. At some point she noticed a piece of bone that "seemed to be part of a skull" with a "hominid" look". After dusting the topsoil away, she found "two large teeth set in the curve of a jaw" and drove back to camp exclaiming "I've got him!" Active excavation began the following day and a partial cranium was unearthed within a few weeks, though it had to be reconstructed from fragments scattered in the scree. After examining the cranium, Louis Leakey concluded it was of a species ancestral to humans, the australopithecines. He eventually dubbed the find Zinjanthropus boisei, "East Africa man"—Zinj is an ancient Arabic word for the East African coast. The name was later revised to Paranthropus boisei, and by some to Australopithecus boisei; a consensus on its classification is still in debate. The anthropologist Francis Clark Howell described this find as ''the beginnings of paleoanthropology in a modern sense."

In the 1960s the Leakeys started to work with the young Kamoya Kimeu with Mary particularly valuing his expertise. The family trained him in paleontology, evolutionary theory and excavating techniques, which he then trained the next generations of Kenyan fossil finders in, as he became a highly respected Kenyan paleontologist and curator.

After her husband died in 1972, Mary Leakey continued their work at Olduvai and Laetoli. It was at the Laetoli site that she discovered hominin fossils that were more than 3.75 million years old.

From 1976 to 1981, Leakey and her staff uncovered the Laetoli hominin footprint trail which had been tracked through a layer of volcanic ash some 3.6 million years ago.

Throughout her career, Leakey discovered fifteen new species of animals, and one new genus. She was elected a Foreign Honorary Member of the American Academy of Arts and Sciences in 1979.

== Family and personal life ==
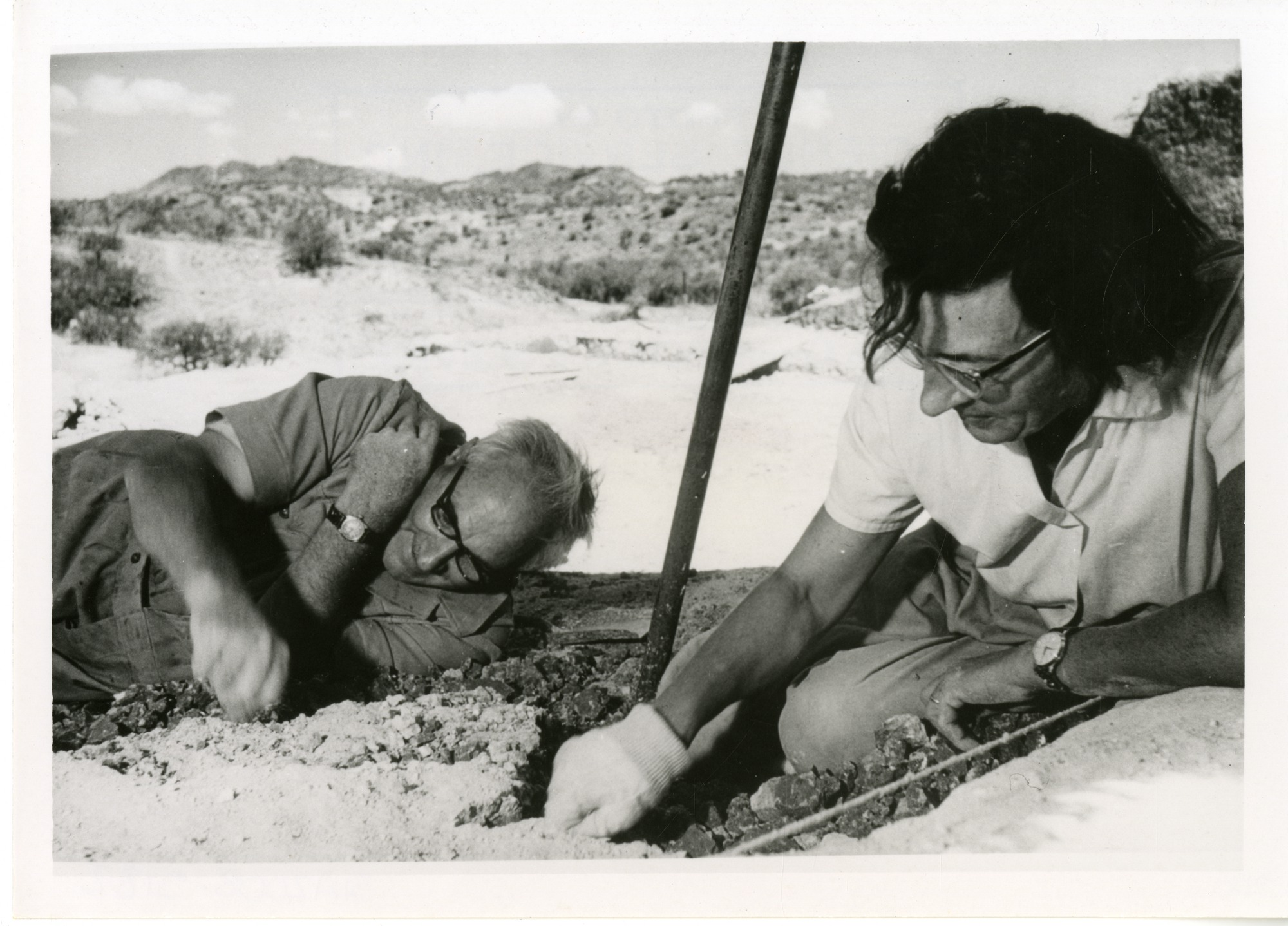
Mary and Louis Leakey at Olduvai Gorge

On her mother's side, Leakey was a great-great-great-granddaughter of the 18th century antiquarian John Frere, an early excavator of Paleolithic stone tools. This ancestry was shared by the historian and archaeologist Sheppard Frere, her 4th cousin. The Frere family had been active abolitionists in the British colonial empire during the 19th century and established several communities for freed slaves. Three of these communities were still in existence when Leakey published her 1984 autobiography: Freretown, Kenya; Freretown, South Africa; and Freretown, India. Her father was the son of the Scottish painter Erskine Nicol.

Then-20-year old Mary Nicol met her future husband Louis through the English archaeologist Gertrude Caton-Thompson, who was helping Lous find an illustrator for his book Adam's Ancestors (1934). This collaboration developed into a friendship and then an affair. The two moved in together while Louis's son Collin by his then-wife Frida was still an infant, and subsequently married after Frida divorced Louis in 1936. This permanently ended his career and good reputation at Cambridge University.

Mary and Louis had three sons: Jonathan, born in 1940, Richard in 1944, and Philip in 1949. Their fourth child, a daughter, died as a baby. The three boys received much of their early childhood care and education at various anthropological sites and, whenever possible, Mary and Louis excavated and surveyed with their sons. Mary would not even allow guests to shoo away the pet hyraxes that helped themselves to food and drink at the dinner table. In her autobiography, she rarely mentioned her pregnancies or the difficulties she faced while raising children in Kenya.

She and her husband are considered the most famous pair among the influential Kenyan-British Leakey family, and their children and grandchildren later become notable figures in anthropology and Kenyan conservation. Richard held many positions in Kenyan academic and conservation institutions, and was a notable anthropologist along with his wife Maeve their daughter Louise. Philip was a member of the Kenyan Parliament from 1979 to 1992.

She died on 9 December 1996, in Nairobi, Kenya, at the age of 83. Her family, who announced her death, did not give the cause, saying only that she died peacefully.

== Legacy ==
In April 2013, Leakey was honoured by Royal Mail in the UK, as one of six people selected as subjects for the "Great Britons" commemorative postage stamp issue. Google celebrated the 100th anniversary of Mary Leakey's birth with its Google doodle for 6 February 2013.

The Mary Leakey Girls' High School, a secondary school for girls near Kikuyu Town, was named after Mary's mother-in-law, Mary Bazett Leakey, mother of her husband, Louis Leakey.

In the video game Civilization VI, Leakey is a 'Great Scientist' that players can recruit. Her unique ability grants extra science and tourism to artifacts.

== Awards and honours ==
==== Honorary degrees ====
- Honorary D.Sc., University of the Witwatersrand, 1968
- Honorary DSSc, Yale, 1976
- Honorary D.Sc., University of Michigan, 1980
- Honorary D.Litt., Oxford, 1981

==== Other awards ====
- The Hubbard Medal of National Geographic Society, 1962 – jointly with Louis Leakey
- The Prestwich Medal, Geological Society of London, 1969 – jointly with Louis Leakey
- Gold Medal of Society of Woman Geographers, 1975
- Great Linnaeus Medal in Gold of the Royal Swedish Academy, 1978
- The Elizabeth Blackwell Award, 1980

== Books authored ==
- Excavations at Njoro River Cave (with Louis Leakey), 1950
- Olduvai Gorge: Excavations in Beds I and II, 1960–1963, 1971, ISBN 9780521077231
- Olduvai Gorge: My Search for Early Man, 1979, ISBN 9780002116138
- Africa's Vanishing Art: The Rock Paintings of Tanzania, 1983
- Disclosing the Past. Garden City, N.Y: Doubleday. 1984. ISBN 978-0-385-18961-3.

== See also ==
- List of fossil sites
- List of human evolution fossils (with images)
