= Joshua Leakey =

British soldier, Victoria Cross recipient

Colour Sergeant Joshua Leakey VC
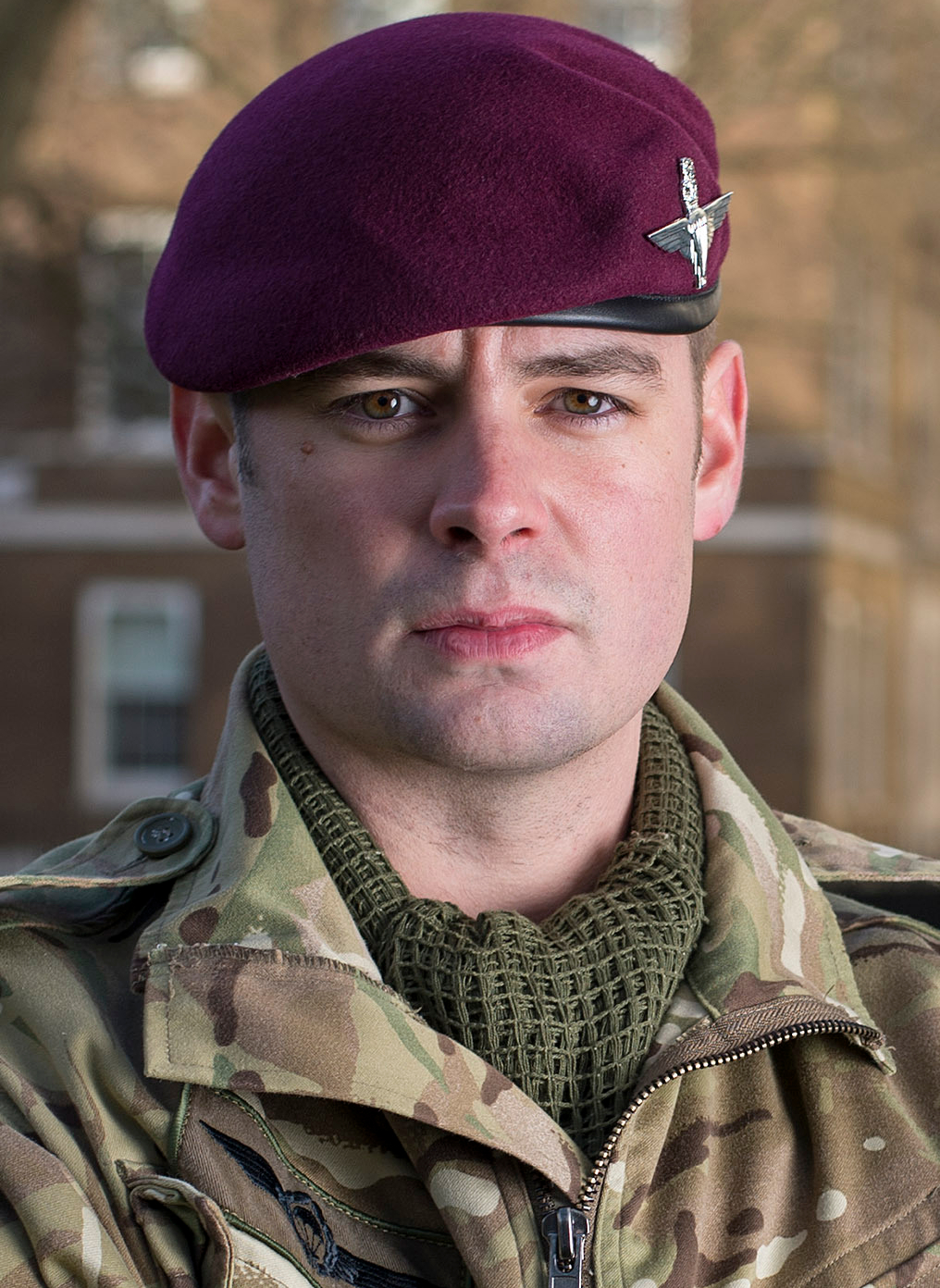
- Leakey in 2015
- Born: 1988 (age 37–38); Tampa, Florida, US
- Relatives: Nigel Leakey (second cousin); David Leakey
- Military career
- Allegiance: United Kingdom
- Branch: British Army
- Service years: 2007–present
- Rank: Colour Sergeant
- Unit: Parachute Regiment
- Conflicts: War in Afghanistan
- Awards: Victoria Cross

Colour Sergeant Joshua Mark Leakey VC (born 1988) is a British soldier currently serving in the Parachute Regiment. In 2015, Leakey was awarded the Victoria Cross, the highest military decoration for valour in the British and Commonwealth armed forces, for his involvement in a joint UK–US raid in Helmand Province, Afghanistan, on 22 August 2013. He was the only living British soldier to be awarded the Victoria Cross for the War in Afghanistan and the last person to receive it from Queen Elizabeth II.

== Early life and family ==
Leakey was born in 1988 in Tampa, Florida, US. He is the son of retired RAF officer and former director of the Armed Forces Christian Union, Air Commodore Mark Leakey, and his wife Rosemary, an occupational therapist. He has a younger brother Ben.

Leakey was educated at Witham Hall preparatory school and, from 1999 to 2006, Christ's Hospital, a private school in Horsham, West Sussex. He began a degree in military history at the University of Kent but dropped out during the first term to join the army.

He is the second member of his family to be awarded the Victoria Cross. His second cousin twice removed, Nigel Leakey, was posthumously awarded the medal during the Second World War. Lieutenant General David Leakey, the former Black Rod and former senior British Army officer, is the son of Nigel's brother Major General Rea Leakey.

== Military career ==
Leakey joined the British Army in 2007 and was subsequently posted to the 1st Battalion, Parachute Regiment. He served three tours of duty in Afghanistan during Operation Herrick: in 2009, 2011 and 2013.

=== Victoria Cross action ===
The actions for which Leakey was awarded the Victoria Cross occurred on 22 August 2013 in Helmand Province, Afghanistan. A routine joint patrol composed of British paratroopers, US Marines and Afghan soldiers had targeted a village to search for illegal weapons. Having been flown into the area in Chinook helicopters, the patrol was attacked by machine gun fire and rocket-propelled grenades soon after dismounting. Leakey's helicopter landed on a hill near the village and he, with three other paratroopers and an Afghan soldier, were to provide fire support for the main segment of the patrol. From their vantage point, his section could see the attack and heard over their radio that someone had been injured. Leakey ran up the hill to assess the seriousness of the attack and concluded that urgent action was needed. Though he was only a lance corporal, he took control of the situation and led his section down to the group under attack.

Having reached the group under attack, he gave first aid to the wounded US Marine Corps captain and began to evacuate him from the battlefield. While under fire, he returned to the machine guns that his section had left at the top of the hill. He moved one to a better position to fire at the attacking Taliban even though he was under constant, accurate fire (bullets were ricocheting off the weapon he was carrying). His actions inspired other soldiers to join in the fight back.

While he was manning the machine gun, he was also shouting updates of the situation into his radio. Having realised that more than one machine gun would be needed to effectively fight back the insurgents, he allowed his gun to be taken over by another soldier. He then ran through heavy fire again to retrieve a second machine gun, positioned it in a suitable site, and manned it to fire at the Taliban.

The skirmish lasted approximately 45 minutes during which 11 insurgents were killed and four wounded. The fighting only ceased when air support arrived, and he then handed the second machine gun over to another soldier. He then returned to the injured American officer and oversaw his evacuation.

The Ministry of Defence summarised the reasons for awarding Leakey the Victoria Cross as follows:

Under fire yet undeterred by the very clear and present danger, Lance Corporal Leakey ran across the exposed slope of the hill three times to initiate casualty evacuation, re-site machine guns and return fire. His actions proved the turning point, inspiring his comrades to fight back with renewed ferocity. Displaying gritty leadership well above that expected of his rank, Lance Corporal Leakey's actions singlehandedly regained the initiative and prevented considerable loss of life.

== Honours and decorations ==
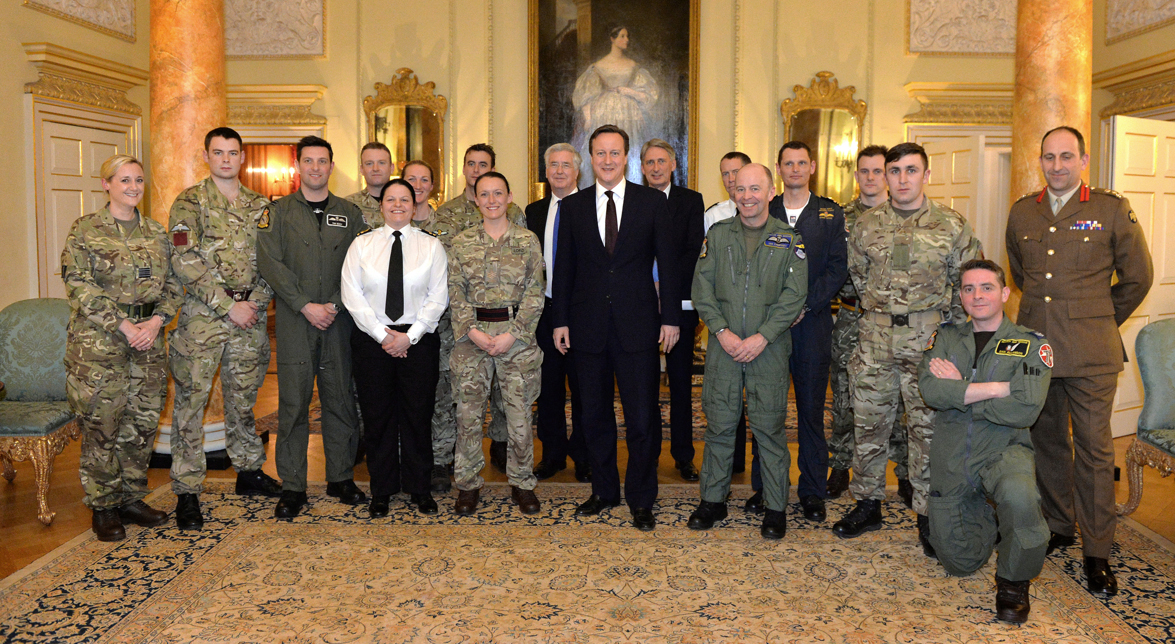
Prime Minister with recipients of the Operational Honours and Awards, 2015

On 26 February 2015, Leakey was awarded the Victoria Cross (VC), the highest military decoration awarded for valour in the United Kingdom. Announcing the award, the Chief of the General Staff, General Sir Nicholas Carter disregarded protocol to embrace Leakey. On 14 April 2015, he received the medal from Queen Elizabeth II during a ceremony at Windsor Castle. He is a recipient of the Operational Service Medal for Afghanistan. Leakey has received the City of London's highest honour to become a Freeman of the city.

The official VC citation reads:

Between May and December 2013, Lance Corporal Leakey was deployed in Afghanistan as a member of a Task Force conducting operations to disrupt insurgent safe-havens and protect the main operating base in Helmand province. The majority of operations took place in daylight in non-permissive areas, attracting significant risk. On the 22nd August 2013, Lance Corporal Leakey deployed on a combined UK / US assault led by the United States Marine Corps into a Taliban stronghold to disrupt a key insurgent group.

After dismounting from their helicopters, the force came under accurate machine gun and rocket propelled grenades fire resulting in the Command Group being pinned down on the exposed forward slope of a hill. The team attempted to extract from the killing zone for an hour, their efforts resulting in a Marine Corps Captain being shot and wounded and their communications being put out of action. Lance Corporal Leakey, positioned on the lee of the hill, realising the seriousness of the situation and with complete disregard for his own safety, dashed across a large area of barren hillside which was now being raked with machine gun fire. As he crested the hill, the full severity of the situation became apparent: approximately twenty enemy had surrounded two friendly machine gun teams and a mortar section rendering their critical fire support ineffective.

Undeterred by the very clear and present danger, Lance Corporal Leakey moved down the forward slope of the hill, and gave first aid to the wounded officer. Despite being the most junior commander in the area, Lance Corporal Leakey took control of the situation and initiated the casualty evacuation. Realising that the initiative was still in the hands of the enemy, he set off back up the hill, still under enemy fire, to get one of the suppressed machine guns into action. On reaching it, and with rounds impacting on the frame of the gun itself, he moved it to another position and began engaging the enemy.

This courageous action spurred those around him back into the fight; nonetheless, the weight of enemy fire continued. For the third time and with full knowledge of the extant dangers, Lance Corporal Leakey exposed himself to enemy fire once more. Weighed down by over 60 lbs of equipment, he ran to the bottom of the hill, picked up the second machine gun and climbed back up the hill again: a round trip of more than 200 metres on steep terrain. Drawing the majority of the enemy fire, with rounds splashing around him, Lance Corporal Leakey overcame his fatigue to re-site the gun and return fire. This proved to be the turning point. Inspired by Lance Corporal Leakey's actions, and with a heavy weight of fire now at their disposal, the force began to fight back with renewed ferocity.

Having regained the initiative, Lance Corporal Leakey handed over the machine gun and led the extraction of the wounded officer to a point from which he could be safely evacuated. During the assault 11 insurgents were killed and 4 wounded, but the weight of enemy fire had effectively pinned down the command team.

Displaying gritty leadership well above that expected of his rank, Lance Corporal Leakey's actions single-handedly regained the initiative and prevented considerable loss of life, allowing a wounded US Marine officer to be evacuated. For this act of valour, Lance Corporal Leakey is highly deserving of significant national recognition.

Country	Date	Appointment	Ribbon	Post-nominal letters	Notes
United Kingdom	26 February 2015	Victoria Cross		VC	
United Kingdom		Operational Service Medal for Afghanistan			With Silver Rosette
United Kingdom	6 February 2022	Queen Elizabeth II Platinum Jubilee Medal			
United Kingdom	6 May 2023	King Charles III Coronation Medal			

== See also ==
- Leakey family
