= Lara Bird =

British politician (born 1998)

Lara Bird MP
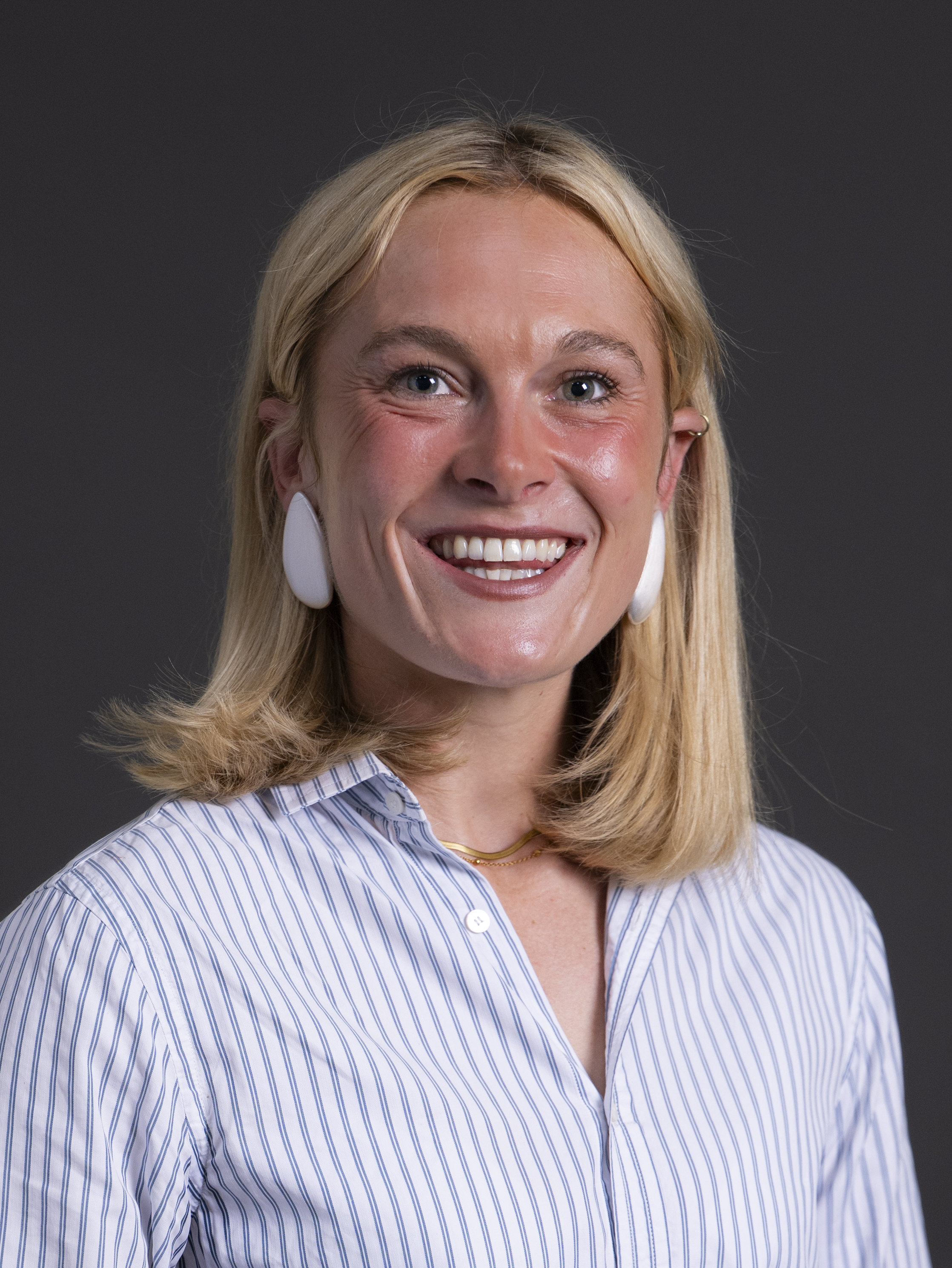
- Official portrait, 2026

Member of Parliament for Arbroath and Broughty Ferry
- Incumbent
- Assumed office 18 June 2026
- Preceded by: Stephen Gethins
- Majority: 5,278 (21.7%)

Personal details
- Born: Pyla Lara Bird-Leakey; 1998 (age 27–28)
- Party: Scottish National Party
- Relatives: Colin Leakey (grandfather)
- Education: University of Sheffield (LLB); London School of Economics (LLM)

Pyla Lara Bird-Leakey (born 1998) is a Scottish National Party politician who has been the Member of Parliament (MP) for Arbroath and Broughty Ferry since 2026.

== Early life and career ==
Bird grew up in Kirriemuir and was privately educated at the High School of Dundee. Her father, Charles Bird OBE, served in the military, as a diplomat and as a lecturer at the University of St Andrews. Her mother is English, and her maternal grandfather, Colin Leakey, was a plant scientist and member of the Leakey family.

She first became involved in politics at the age of 16, around the time of the 2014 Scottish independence referendum.

Bird graduated from the University of Sheffield with an LLB and then moved to London, where she completed an LL.M in Public International Law at the London School of Economics. Bird was called to the English Bar at Middle Temple, one of the four Inns of Court, in 2025. She worked for the SNP at Westminster as a foreign affairs and defence researcher, and then as a policy advisor. She moved back to Scotland after the 2024 United Kingdom general election and now lives in Broughty Ferry. She was a PhD student at King's College London until she quit her studies to run for Parliament.

== Parliamentary career ==
On 20 May 2026, Bird was selected as the SNP candidate for the 2026 Arbroath and Broughty Ferry by-election, called to replace Stephen Gethins. She was elected on 18 June, holding the seat for the SNP with an increased majority of 4,961, and was sworn in as a Member of Parliament on 22 June. She visibly crossed her fingers as she swore the oath of allegiance, saying, "I take this oath only so that I can serve the people of Arbroath and Broughty Ferry. My first allegiance is, and always will be, [to] the sovereign people of Scotland."

Footage of the swearing-in prompted comment on social media and in the press contrasting Bird's Scottish accent in the chamber with the Received Pronunciation she had used in earlier videos, with some opponents accusing her of putting on a Scottish accent. In an interview with The Courier before the by-election, Bird had attributed the difference to time spent in London and having English family, saying her Dundonian accent returned more strongly when she was back in Dundee.

Parliament of the United Kingdom
Preceded by Stephen Gethins	Member of Parliament for Arbroath and Broughty Ferry; 2026–present	Incumbent
