= Emmanuel de Merode =

Belgian conservationist (born 1970)

Prince Emmanuel de Merode
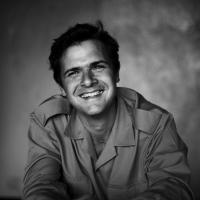
- De Merode in 2013
- Full name: Emmanuel Werner Marie Ghislain de Merode
- Born: 5 May 1970 (age 56); Carthage, Tunisia
- Noble family: Merode
- Spouse: Louise Leakey (m. 2003)
- Issue: Princess Seiyia; Princess Alexia
- Father: Prince Charles-Guillaume de Merode
- Mother: Princess Hedwige de Ligne-La Trémoïlle
- Occupation: Director of Virunga National Park

Prince Emmanuel de Merode (Emmanuel Werner Marie Ghislain de Merode; born 5 May 1970) is a conservationist and anthropologist. He has been the director of Virunga National Park in the Democratic Republic of the Congo (DRC) since 2008.

== Family ==
Merode was born in Carthage, Tunisia. He is the second son of Charles-Guillaume, Prince de Merode and Princess Hedwige Marie de Ligne-La Trémoïlle. His parents belong to two of Belgium's historically most ancient and influential families, the Houses of Merode and Ligne. He descends patrilineally from Félix, Count de Merode, a military commander during the successful Belgian Revolution of 1830 who helped form the first Belgian legislative council and government. His mother's branch of the House of Ligne are also the heirs to a French princely family, the House of La Trémoille; his maternal uncle is Prince Charles-Antoine Lamoral de La Trémoïlle, 13th Duke of Thouars.

Merode does not use his hereditary title in professional contexts; however, he is legally a prince in the Belgian nobility, the title having been conferred upon the family by King Albert I in 1929. His elder brother, Prince Frédéric de Merode, is married and heir to his father's multiple titles as head of the family.

== Upbringing ==
Charles-Guillaume's sons grew up outside Nairobi in Kenya and Merode studied at the Banda School before attending Downside School and Durham University, where he graduated with a Bachelor of Arts degree in 1992. He earned a PhD in Anthropology from University College, London (UCL), having concentrated on Congolese conservation issues. He has lived in the eastern Democratic Republic of Congo (formerly known as Zaire) since 1993, currently residing in Rumangabo, Virunga National Park's headquarters.

== Career ==
Merode has worked to control the bushmeat trade and protect endangered wildlife in Central and Eastern Africa. His main focus has been on supporting the work of African wildlife rangers in conflict affected areas by driving economic development in partnership with local communities. His work was primarily in the parks of eastern DRC, working to sustain the national parks through the country's 20-year civil war. Merode is the author of fourteen scientific papers and co-editor of the book Virunga: The Survival of Africa's First National Park.

On 1 August 2008, he was appointed Director of Virunga National Park by the Congolese government. He now lives at the park headquarters in Rumangabo, bordering the park's mountain gorilla sector. The park's 680 rangers are under his direction and much of his work is focused on protecting the park's wildlife, including critically important populations of mountain gorillas, elephants, okapis and chimpanzees. His first breakthrough was to broker an agreement between the Congolese government and rebel leader Laurent Nkunda to spare the mountain gorilla sector of the park from the ongoing civil war and to enable government rangers to redeploy in rebel territory. Negotiating the neutral status of environmental and sustainable development imperatives among the warring factions in eastern Congo became a recurring theme in Merode's approach to establishing Virunga National Park as a stabilizing presence in the war-affected Great Lakes Region of Africa.

Given the chronic insecurity and the succession of violent wars in eastern Congo, Merode and a team of over 3000 conservationists and development practitioners have focused their efforts on economic development initiatives in a large-scale attempt to bring greater stability to the region. In 2013 he assisted in the launching of the Virunga Alliance in an effort to drive the post-war economy of eastern Congo as an instrument for peace-building in the region. The initiative is based on 127 local institutions from the private sector, civil society and government agencies committing to the sustainable development of the parks resources, through tourism, rural electrification through clean energy, sustainable fisheries and agriculture. A major program aims to generate 80-100,000 jobs in the post-war communities around the national park, providing young Congolese men and women viable alternatives to engaging in conflict related activities.

At his swearing in ceremony, Merode remarked, "The intensity of the conflict in and around the park makes this a daunting challenge, but it is a great privilege to be working alongside such a dedicated and courageous team of rangers. I have real confidence in our ability to secure a future for the park to ensure that it makes a positive contribution to the lives of the people of North Kivu." His role in maintaining the Park's administration during the M23 Rebellion was covered in the Oscar-nominated British documentary Virunga.

He has spoken about his work and the work of the rangers of Virunga in a TEDxWWF talk, "A story of conflict, renewal and hope". Under his leadership, the Virunga park opened to the public again in 2014.

== Assassination attempt ==
On 15 April 2014, Merode was critically injured by unidentified gunmen during an ambush on the road between Goma and Rumangabo, hours after a meeting with the state prosecutor. It was reported that, during this meeting, Merode submitted a report on the park's 4-year enquiry in the actions of an oil-company alleged to be illegally exploring for oil in Virunga National Park. He was shot several times in the chest and abdomen, but survived and was able to leave the scene of the attack with the help of local residents. Emergency surgery was performed at a local hospital in Goma. A legal enquiry into the motives and identity of the attackers was undertaken by the Congolese authorities. Media reports have cited various suspects, including those engaged in the illegal production of charcoal, people associated with SOCO International, a British oil company engaged in the exploration for oil in the national park, opponents of the park's law enforcement activities, disgruntled local residents, and those engaged in struggles to control park lands including, at the time, factions of the Democratic Forces for the Liberation of Rwanda (FDLR) and of the Congolese military.

Merode returned to Virunga National Park on 22 May 2014 to resume his functions as Park Director.

== Personal life ==
Merode married Louise Leakey, a paleontologist from Kenya, in 2003. They have two daughters.

== Honours and titles ==
De Merode has received several international awards. Among others, including public recognition from Philippe, King of the Belgians, Albert, Prince of Monaco, Prince William, Duke of Cambridge and Princess Marie-Esméralda of Belgium.

=== Titles ===
- Prince de Merode, by birth.
- Dr. of Philosophy – Biological Anthropology. University College London
- Dr. Honoris Causa, honorary doctorate of law – University of Hasselt.
- Doctor of Humane Letters: Stony Brook University, 2017.

=== Honours ===
==== National honours ====
- Belgium: Knight Grand Officer of the Order of Leopold I
- UK: Honorary Officer of the Order of the British Empire, 2019

=== International recognition ===
- The Tusk Award for Conservation in Africa 2015.
- National Geographic Explorer of the Year, Award, 2015.
- Biodiversity Award of Prince Albert II of Monaco Foundation
- Albert Schweitzer Award
- Zoological Society of London Conservationist of the Year
- Franklin D. Roosevelt Freedom from Want Award

== Ancestors ==
Ancestors of Emmanuel de Merode

8. Prince Félix de Merode
4. Xavier, Prince de Merode (1910–1980)
9. Françoise de Clermont-Tonnerre
2. Charles Guillaume, Prince de Merode, Markies van Westerloo. (1940–)
10. Emmanuel d'Alvar de Biaudos de Castéja
5. Elisabeth Alvar de Biaudos de Castéja (1914–1994)
11. Claude de Kergorlay (1888– 1975)
1. Prince Emmanuel
12. Prince Henri-Florent Lamoral of Ligne
6. Prince Jean Charles Lamoral de La Trémoïlle, 12th Duke of Thouars
13. Princess Charlotte de La Trémoille, 11th Duchess of Thouars
3. Princess Hedwige Marie of Ligne-La Trémoïlle
14. Charles Edmond de Lambertye, Marquis de Gerbéviller (1883–)
7. Maria del Rosario de Lambertye-Gerbéviller
15. Lina Sancho-Mata y Contreras

== Publications ==
- Macmillan (2005) Protected areas and decentralisation in the Democratic Republic of Congo: a case for devolving responsibility to local institutions (in Rural Resources and Local Livelihoods in Africa, Edited by Katherine Homewood). Emmanuel de Merode
- Proceedings of the Royal Society of London. B (2004) Volume 271, pages 2631–2636 Do wildlife laws work? Species protection and the application of a prey choice model to poaching decisions. Marcus Rowcliffe, Emmanuel de Merode and Guy Cowlishaw.
- De Merode, Emmanuel; Homewood, Katherine; Cowlishaw, Guy (2004), "The value of bushmeat and other wild foods to rural households living in extreme poverty in Democratic Republic of Congo", Biological Conservation, 118 (5): 573–581, Bibcode:2004BCons.118..573D, doi:10.1016/j.biocon.2003.10.005
- Overseas Development Institute Wildlife Policy Series (2003) Volume 1 Wild resources and livelihoods of poor households in the Democratic Republic of Congo. Emmanuel de Merode, Katherine Homewood & Guy Cowlishaw.
- International Journal of Remote Sensing (2000) Volume 21, Numbers 13–14, pages 2665–2683 The spatial correlates of wildlife distribution around Garamba National Park, Democratic Republic of Congo. De Merode E, K. Hillman-Smith, A. Nicholas, A. Ndey, M. Likango.
- Earthscan Publications (1999) Promoting Partnerships: Managing Wildlife Resources in Central and West Africa. J. Abbot, F. Ananze, N. Barning, P. Burnham, E. de Merode, A. Dunn, E. Fuchi, E. Hakizumwami, C. Hesse, R. Mwinyihali, M.M. Sani, D. Thomas, P. Trench, R. Tshombe
- WWF sustainable development series, (1999) Towards Financial Sustainability for Protected Areas: learning from business approaches. A. Inamdar, E. de Merode
- PhD Thesis, University of London (1998) Protected Areas and Local Livelihoods: Contrasting Systems of Wildlife Management in the Democratic Republic of Congo.
- PLA Notes (1998) Volume 33, Pages 27–33 Participatory GIS: opportunity or oxymoron. Jo Abbot, Robert Chambers, Christine Dunn, Trevor Harris, Emmanuel de Merode, Gina Porter, Janet Townsend and Daniel Weiner
- Pachyderm (1995) Volume 19, pages 39–48 Factors affecting elephant distribution at Garamba National Park and surrounding reserves, Zaïre, with focus on human elephant conflict. Hillman Smith, A. K. K., E. de Merode, A. Nicholas, B. Buls, and A. Ndey.
