= Frida Leakey =

First wife of Louis Leakey

- Born: Henrietta Wilfrida Avern; 1902
- Died: 19 August 1993 (aged 90–91)
- Education: Newnham College
- Occupation: Teacher
- Known for: Discovering Frida Leakey Gorge
- Spouse: Louis Leakey (m. 1928; div. 1936)
- Children: Priscilla Muthoni Leakey; Colin Leakey

Henrietta Wilfrida "Frida" Leakey; née Avern (1902 – 19 August 1993), also known as H. Wilfrida Leakey, was a British teacher and archaeological illustrator who discovered a gorge that was named FLK or "Frida Leakey Korongo". The gorge was the site of ancient stone tools and important human fossil discoveries. Leakey was the first wife of paleoanthropologist and archaeologist, Louis Leakey. She later became a leader in the Women's Institute and a County Councillor in Cambridgeshire.

== Life ==
She was born in 1902 and her father, Henry Averne, sold cork in Reigate in Surrey. She attended the Sorbonne before going on to Newnham College, Cambridge. She then went to Kent where she worked teaching French at Benenden School in Tunbridge Wells.

She married paleoanthropologist Louis Leakey in 1928 and their first child was a daughter Priscilla Muthoni Leakey. Frida used an inheritance to purchase a large brick house in Girton, which the family named "The Close".

She participated in digs in East Africa and learnt how to construct archaeological illustrations during fieldwork. It is her illustrations that are included in "The Stone Age Cultures of Kenya Colony" published by her husband in 1931. The book describes their excavations in 1926–7 and 1928–9.

In 1931 she discovered a gorge off Olduvai Gorge that was named "FLK" for "Frida Leakey Korongo". This gorge would be an outstanding source of human fossils.

Her husband's behaviour was criticised by both Nairobi society and his family and friends when he left her just after the birth of their son Colin in December 1933. She had suffered from severe morning sickness throughout the pregnancy and had been unable to work on the illustrations for Louis's second book, Adam's Ancestors. Louis recruited Mary Nichol to work on the illustrations and their collaboration turned into an affair. In 1936, Frida divorced Louis for his infidelity and he quickly married Mary. Frida, her son, and her daughter went to live in Cambridge. Colin did not see his father again until he was 19.

During the Second World War she organised billeting at Girton College. She was elected chair of the Women's Institute in Cambridgeshire and she was elected as an independent county councillor for Cambridgeshire.

== Death and legacy ==
She died in 1993, leaving two children.

The gorge that she had discovered, Frida Leakey Korongo, was found to have had hominids (Homo erectus) living there 1.5 million years ago. They used stone tools and their diet included the hippopotamus. Excavations were still ongoing in 2019.

== Works ==
- Cambridgeshire: A Chronicle of Country Women, 1918-1968. Royston: The Priory Press, 1968.
