= Fiona Marshall =

American archaeologist

Academic background
- Education: University of California, Berkeley
- Thesis: Aspects of the advent of pastoral economies in East Africa (1986)

Academic work
- Discipline: Anthropologist
- Sub-discipline: Ethnoarchaeology and Zooarchaeology
- Institutions: Washington University in St. Louis
- Website: anthropology.artsci.wustl.edu/marshall_fiona

Fiona Brigid Marshall is an archaeologist at Washington University in St. Louis. Her methodological specialties are zooarchaeology and ethnoarchaeology. She has excavated Pastoral Neolithic sites in eastern Africa, focusing primarily on the domestication and herding of animals, particularly cattle and donkeys. She has also conducted ethnoarchaeological research on factors that affect body part representation in archaeological sites, and on foraging ways of life amongst Okiek people of the western Mau Escarpment, Kenya. She has also worked to conserve the Laetoli footprints.

== Biography ==
A native of Kenya, Fiona Marshall received her PhD from the University of California, Berkeley in 1986. She is currently the James W. and Jean L. Davis Professor in Arts and Sciences at Washington University in St. Louis. She is also a member of the National Academy of Sciences, the American Academy of Arts and Sciences, and the American Association for the Advancement of Science.

== Research ==
Fiona Marshall works on Pastoral Neolithic sites in eastern Africa. Food production started in southwest Asia about 10,000 years ago, leading to higher populations, cities, and social stratification. This early food production may have led to the current distribution of wealth. The Neolithic in Africa, however, went differently. Instead of people becoming sedentary farmers, many peoples in Africa became mobile herders. But this pastoralism did not spread throughout all of Africa; it was more sporadic around the Sahara. Africa did eventually develop food production in farming, it was just later than the rest of the world at around 4000 BP. Marshall has examined the question of why ancient peoples domesticated wild plants and animals. Cattle were the first domesticates in North Africa around 10,000-8000 BP. The reason that cattle were so useful is because they allow pastoralists to adapt to changing climates. Even though pastoralism took root in Africa, Marshall points out that herding also contributed to the unequal spread of food. Pastoralism is also more labor-intensive and unpredictable than hunting-and-gathering, which is why Marshall believes that it was more patchy throughout Africa rather than taking it all over at once.

Along with food production, she analyzes the arrival of specialized pastoralism in East Africa. The specialization may have occurred because of the increased pastoral production opportunities in East Africa at that time. There are certain groups in East Africa that have been, and still are, very specialized pastoralists; groups like the Maasai, Samburu, and Rendille. These groups are basically fully reliant on their herded cattle, sheep, and goats with little to no hunting-and-gathering and fishing practices. Marshall's research at the site of Ngamuriak, Kenya, has shown that while early pastoralists in the Turkana Basin, Kenya, practiced a more generalized herding system, while specialized pastoralism developed farther south 2000 years ago. The steadying of the climate 3,000 years ago may have been one of the reasons that this specialization may have started to occur because the people could now rely on certain seasons to do certain things and could move their settlements accordingly. Another important factor may have been interaction between pastoralists and the hunter-gatherer groups around them.

Marshall also looks at the difference between the archaeological remains left behind by pastoralists and hunter-gatherer groups. Identifying pastoralist sites is not always easy: pastoralists tend to not leave well-defined sites behind after they move on, and what they do leave behind does not always preserve well. In East Africa, the thing that tends to differentiate the two is the type of lithics that they create. Ceramics in this area are associated with both hunter-gatherers and pastoralists, although interaction between pastoralists and hunter-gatherer groups blurs these lines and makes it much harder for archaeologists to distinguish the two from each other. Marshall argues that the amount of dung that accumulates in corrals can also distinguish pastoralist and hunter-gatherer sites. However, dung is organic material which decomposes over time. Marshall suggests that when archaeologists select a site that might have been a pastoralist site, that they choose a site that is away from the water sources because some things, like phosphate minerals, will be better preserved.

Another thing she does is look at animal bones from Neolithic sites to see what the people at those sites were eating. Looking at the bones that are represented at a site can help the archaeologist determine whether the site is a butchery site or a habitation site. Marshall looked at the bones that were discovered at Ngamuriak, Kenya, which were almost all from the domesticated cattle, sheep, and goats. Marshall found that the cattle long bones were typically broken. Her theory, supported by observation of fracture patterns, is that these bones were broken in order to get the bone grease inside.

== Influence on others ==
Marshall has been very influential with archaeologists who study pastoralism in Africa. Her article from 2002 with Elisabeth Hildebrand, "Cattle Before Crops: The Beginnings of Food Production in Africa," has been cited 279 times (as of December 2016). Albano Beja-Pereira et al. also use her paper in their article "The Origin of European Cattle: Evidence From Modern and Ancient DNA" from 2006. They acknowledge that cattle may have been domesticated from Africa first, and they use Marshall's research to help figure out where the cattle seen in the European archaeological record came from.

Her 1990 article "The Origin of Specialized Pastoral Production in East Africa" has been cited more than 100 times (as of December 2016). This paper has been used by the same archaeologists that would have looked at the one mentioned above. This paper has been cited by Diane Gifford-Gonzalez in her paper "Animal Disease Challenges to the Emergence of Pastoralism in Sub-Saharan Africa". Gifford-Gonzalez uses Marshall's work about where specialized pastoralism began to help her make her argument about how being so close to animals may have affected their health. The specialization of pastoralism would have opened up the people to new diseases that they otherwise would not have been exposed to before.
