= Enkapune Ya Muto =

Archaeological site in Kenya

- Twilight Cave
- location in Kenya
- 0°50′0″S 36°09′0″E
- Location: Mau Escarpment of Kenya
- Region: Kenya

Enkapune Ya Muto, also known as Twilight Cave, is a site spanning the late Middle Stone Age to the Late Stone Age on the Mau Escarpment of Kenya. This time span has allowed for further study of the transition from the Middle Stone Age to the Late Stone Age. In particular, the changes in lithic and pottery industries can be tracked over these time periods as well as transitions from a hunter-gatherer lifestyle to a herding lifestyle. Beads made of perforated ostrich egg shells found at the site have been dated to 40,000 years ago. The beads found at the site represent the early human use of personal ornaments. Inferences pertaining to climate and environment changes during the pre-Holocene and Holocene period have been made based from faunal remains based in this site.

== Location ==
Enkapune Ya Muto is located on the Mau Escarpment above the Naivasha basin in the Central Rift Valley. Underneath the shelter is a steep 2400-meter drop into a gully located on the west side of the Rift Valley. This area has large deposits of volcanic geological features. In particular, obsidian is very common.

== Excavation ==
Two major excavations have been done at Enkapune Ya Muto. In total, 18 1-m squares in the northern section over the rock shelter were excavated. The first excavation, by Stanley Ambrose, occurred in 1982. This excavation revealed Middle Stone Age and Later Stone Age artifacts. The excavation was made up of a 2 x 2 m test pit and a 1 x 4 m step trench.

A later 10 m^{2} excavation, also by Stanley Ambrose occurred in 1987 to gain more Late Pleistocene data and find dates for the Middle Stone Age to Late Stone Age transition. The depth of the excavation was 5.54 m.

== Stratigraphy and radiocarbon dating ==
Stanley H. Ambrose's Chronology of the Later Stone Age and Food Production in East Africa splits Enkapune Ya Muto into 18 main strata. Radiocarbon dating has been used to estimate the ages of these layers based on artifacts and fauna in Enkapune Ya Muto. Some dates are less reliable than others due to small sample sizes or contamination from long periods of storage.

Layer	Radiocarbon Date (BP)
Iron Age	500 (middle), 1295 (base)
Elmenteitan	2355 (top), 2595 (base)
BSS	2570 - 2610
HTL	2820*
BS1	2860-3280
RBL1	3390
VA1	3125
RBL2.1	3110-4860
RBL2.2	5365
RBL2.3	5365
DBS	5220-5782
VA2	<6350
RBL3	6350**
VA3/DBL1.1	<35,800
DBL1.2	35,800***
DBL1.3	37,000
GG/OL	<40,000
RBL4	41,400****

*: This is an upper bound guess. Other labs have produced dates of 2330-2560 BP.

**: Has also been dated to 5860 BP, but 6350 BP is viewed as more reliable as the sample size was larger.

***: Multiple earlier start dates have been found, but due to small sample size, they are viewed as unreliable.

****: Earlier dates have been measured but the samples leading to such dates spent extensive time in storage before testing and were likely contaminated.

== Iron Age and Elmenteitan ==
The Iron Age level is mainly characterized by its Lanet Tradition pottery. The base of layer, however, is aceramic. The transition period to the Elmenteitan occurs approximately 45–55 cm below the top of the Iron Age level and is dated to 1295 BP. This date of transition is consistent with other Rift Valley sites.

The Elmenteitan level is 60–100 cm with high levels of wood ash and silts. Elmeinteitan stone tools, made of obsidian specifically, and pottery are found throughout the stratum. This level also contains well-preserved stained bone throughout. There is evidence of cattle and caprines. The bovid and caprine remains found show a gradual drop in the frequency of animals over the age of 20 months old, suggesting culling the animals at a later age when compared to Ngamuriak animals.

== Later Stone Age ==
=== BSS and HTL ===
The BSS and HTL layers have very similar, but not well understood contents. Both contained pottery of an "undefined archaeological culture" and very few bones or artifacts. While bone sample sizes were difficult to analyze due to their small size, caprines and cattle were found to be present, while wild fauna were not found.

=== Eburran Phase 5 ===
Multiple stratum contain artifacts attributed to the Eburran Phase 5 Industry.

==== BS1 ====
BS1 is the 6 cm uppermost Eburran Horizon. Ceramics, dated to 2700 and 3000 BP, are not identifiable as a known tradition, but the lithic tools are attributed to Eburran Phase 5. While the upper part of the layer has few of these artifacts, the lower part has a higher frequency of them. This layer contains bones and teeth of domestic caprines after 3000 BP. By 3280 BP, the faunal assemblage is taken over by domestic caprines. Unlike the Elmenteitan period, animals over 20 months old show a large frequency drop, suggesting culling almost always happened at that age. All bones found in this stratum showed signs of post-depositional burning. Due to the low lithic artifact and bone density, Ambrose suggests that the site underwent low intensity occupation.

==== RBL1 ====
RBL1 is a 10 cm stratum directly underneath BS1. No pottery was found in this layer, but abundant Eburran lithics and bone were found. Despite the abundance of bones, they were not well preserved. Cattle and caprines as well as wild fauna are found in this layer, but cattle were more rare. This is cattle's first appearance at Enkapune Ya Muto. The wild fauna found consisted of oribi, steinbok, reedbuck, bush duiker, bushbuck, and serval.

==== RBL2.1 ====
RBL2.1 contained Salasun, Nderit, and Ileret ceramics aged at 3000 to 4900 BP. Eburran lithics, artifacts and well preserved bone were also found throughout the layer. Relative to bone density, there is a high artifact density, which Ambrose suggests may be due to high occupation and trampling of the bones. The first domesticated caprines at Enkapune Ya Muto were found in the middle of the layer dated to 4000 BP. The first pottery at the site was found at the base of the layer. Most of the faunal assemblage was dominated by wild fauna. The presence of warthog and cheetah remains suggests a receding of the montane forest previously near the shelter, as both rely on open grasslands to survive. Along with these wild fauna, impala, hartebest, oribi, giant forest hog, steinbok, mountain reedbuck, bushbuck, black-backed jackal, spotted hyena, wild cat, and serval cat remains were also found. Small bovids were present but not yet domesticated. The bohor reedbuck in lower strata was the dominant reedbuck, but the mountain reedbuck becomes the dominant in this stratum.

=== Eburran Phase 4 ===
The earliest Holocene period occupation is demarcated by Eburran Phase 4 strata.

==== RBL2.2 and RBL2.3 ====
RBL2.2 and RBL2.3 are very similar in contents. Both contain Eburran Phase 4 lithics, high artifact density, and well-preserved bones. Wild fauna in RBL2.2 consisted of hartebeests, oribi, steinboks, bohor reedbucks, bush duikers, buffalo, bushbucks, bovids, cheetahs, black-backed jackals, spotted hyaenas, wild cats, and serval cats. RBL2.3 contained very similar wild fauna, with the addition of impala, Thomson's gazelle, dik-dik, and golden jackal, and without the buffalo, black-backed jackal, spotted hyena, and golden jackal. The presence of the golden jackal is notable because it suggests the surrounding area was a low-altitude savanna. Curtis Marean notes that Lake Naivasha had begun to retreat during the time period of RBL2.3, likely creating a "short-grass" habitat.

==== DBS ====
RBL2.3 and DBS have been dated within 500 years of each other between 5265 and 5785 BP. DBS has low artifact density but high, well-preserved bone density. DBS showed high wild faunal diversity, with all the wild fauna found in RBL2.3 being present aside from the dik-dik, cheetah, and golden jackal. In addition, roan, bushpig, buffalo, lesser kudu, black-backed jackal, and golden jackal remains were also found. Marean uses these faunal remains to claim that the Holocene drying trend began during the formation of DBS. Ambrose further says that decreased rainfall and an approaching forest ecotone may have led to increased occupation intensity.

===== RBL3 =====
RBL3 is the lowest Eburran Phase 4 stratum. It contains high artifact density, in particular of obsidian, and well-preserved bones, though the sample size is small. According to Ambrose, RBL3 may represent a period of 30,000 years of sporadic occupation. RBL3's faunal assemblage is not quite as diverse as DBS's faunal assemblage. The present wild fauna are giant forest hog, roan, bushpig, bohor reedbuck, bush duiker, buffalo, eland, bushbuck, lesser kudu, bovids, black-backed jackal, spotted hyaena, and serval cats. Most bones are cranial, suggesting transportation of full carcasses.

=== Sakutiek Industry ===
==== DBL ====
The DBL layer has about 69,000 pieces of flaked stone, but very few identifiable bones. The lithic industry is attributed to the Late Stone Age Sakutiek Industry. These tools mostly consist of convex end scrapers, outils écaillés and some backed microliths. Some typically Middle Stone Age tools are present as well such as parti-bifacially flaked small knives and discoidal cores. Thirteen complete ostrich eggshell beads, 12 bead preforms, and 593 shells fragments were found in this layer. Charcoal found in DBL1.2 dated the layer to about 35,800 BP, and ostrich eggshells were dated DBL1.3 to 39,900 BP. Such a large amount of ostrich eggshell beads and evidence of manufacturing suggests a period of high occupation. This is further supported by the faunal assemblage being highly fragmented seemingly by trampling or compaction. The only faunal assemblages found belonged to bovids, baboons, cane rats, and eland.

=== Nasampolai Industry ===
==== GG/OL ====
The GG1 and GG2 are interspersed with OL layers and overall have an average thickness of 1.15 m. Very few artifacts or identifiable bones were found in this layer. Obsidian lithic tools of the Nasampolai Industry were the main artifact found. These blades are large-backed but do not have the early LSA convex end scraper. Red ochre has been found on the modified side of the blades. Evidence of wind-deflation suggests a long period of little to no occupation prior to 40,000 BP. The only faunal assemblage to be found were bovids, hyrax, and roan.

== Middle Stone Age ==
=== Endingi Industry ===
==== RBL4 ====
RBL4 is a 1.2 m thick layer that has low densities of both bone and flaked stone. What flaked stone was found was attributed to the Endingi Industry based on flakes with faceted platforms and radial dorsal scar patterns. Scrapers, outils écaillés, and backed microliths were mainly found. An ochre-stained lower grindstone was also found. Marean notes that RBL4's thickness likely indicates a sparse occupation of the site "during early oxygen isotope stage 3 or stage 4." Hartebeest, zebra, bushpig, eland, bushbuck, and bovid remains were found in this layer.

== See also ==
- List of Stone Age art
- Eburran industry
