= Mumba Cave =

National Historic Site of Tanzania

- Site location in Tanzania
- 3°32′18″S 35°17′48″E
- Type: Settlement
- Periods: Middle Stone Age & Late Stone Age
- Location: Karatu District, Arusha Region, Tanzania
- Region: Eastern Africa

History
- Abandoned: Late Stone Age

Site notes
- Excavation dates: 1934, 1936 & 1938
- Archaeologists: Ludwig and Margit Kohl-Larsen, M.J. Mehlman
- Condition: Excavated
- Owner: Tanzanian Government
- Management: Antiquities Division, Ministry of Natural Resources and Tourism
- Public access: Yes

National Historic Sites of Tanzania
- Official name: Mumba Cave
- Type: Cultural

Mumba Cave, located near the highly alkaline Lake Eyasi in Karatu District, Arusha Region, Tanzania. The cave is a rich archaeological site noted for deposits spanning the transition between the Middle Stone Age and Late Stone Age in Eastern Africa. The transitional nature of the site has been attributed to the large presence of its large assemblage of ostrich eggshell beads and more importantly, the abundance of microlith technology. Because these type artifacts were found within the site it has led archaeologists to believe that the site could provide insight into the origins of modern human behavior. The cave was originally tested by Ludwig Kohl-Larsen and his wife Margit in their 1934 to 1936 expedition. They found abundant artifacts, rock art, and burials. However, only brief descriptions of these findings were ever published. That being said, work of the Kohl-Larsens has been seen as very accomplished due to their attention to detail, especially when one considers that neither was versed in proper archaeological techniques at the time of excavation. The site has since been reexamined in an effort to reanalyze and complement the work that has already been done, but the ramifications of improper excavations of the past are still being felt today, specifically in the unreliable collection of C-14 data and confusing stratigraphy.

== The Kohl-Larsen excavation ==
In 1938 Margit Kohl-Larsen returned to Mumba Cave in an effort to obtain a more complete understanding of the site. Although her work was considered a great triumph in African archaeology at the time, more recent work at the site has illuminated issues from the excavation. Most of the problems lie with the lack of study of the site's uncovered artifacts, soil samples, and faunal remains. Additional problems lie in that very little information from the site, most of which is now considered unclear, ended up being published by Ludwig Kohl-Larsen in 1943.

Further excavations have revealed that there was a significant disregard for the lithic assemblage at the sites, making it clear that Kohl-Larsen favored large lithics above secondary or tertiary flakes. It has been calculated that only the largest 2% of the stones were collected. However, this is unsurprising since the presence of microliths was not yet realized as a hallmark of the Late Stone Age. All problems considered, archaeologists such as M.J. Melhman have stated that the importance of the site should not be downplayed.

== Site stratigraphy ==
During the Kohl-Larsen excavation the stratigraphy and levels of the site were determined within its nine by twelve and a half meters area. Depth of the excavation varies between sources as bedrock has said to have been to be reached between nine and eleven meters. The site was divided into six beds that are now recognized as potentially problematic but still used for reference in present work and reanalysis. In later excavations, artifacts from each of the defined beds have been dated using radiocarbon dating techniques. Unfortunately, it has been difficult to confirm and fully understand the site due to heavily mixed deposits from the Kohl-Larsen excavations, few comparable sites, and lack of data on the past environmental conditions. Each bed has been C-14 dated; however, some scholars question these dates.

=== Bed I ===
Bed I is referred to as the surface level of the site. It has been noted to contains remnants of obsidian, ostrich eggshell beads, fireplace wood, pottery sherds, and arrowheads that are similar to those fashioned by the Hadza people.

=== Bed II ===
Artifacts from Bed II have been dated using radiocarbon to 381 ± 91 B.P. Amongst rockfall debris, this bed contains both human and animals bones, including the bones of turtles and fish, some of which have been carved. Other artifacts include ostrich eggshell beads, pottery, obsidian tools, red ochre.

=== Bed III ===
Bed III contains a particular rich assemblage with the presence of a kitchen midden made of several animal bones and broken pottery. The bed also includes decorated ostrich eggshell beads and pottery. Additionally several human burials found at the site were discovered within this bed. The ceramic artifacts found in this bed are attributed to a type known as "Kansyore Ware", associated with hunter/gatherer peoples. Also found were Neolithic "Narosura Ware" and Iron Age "Lelesu Ware." This bed has an associated radiocarbon date of 844 ± 78 B.P.

=== Bed IV ===
This Bed is recognized by archaeologists as sterile containing a large beach deposit. Dates from available material are 21530 ± 320 B.P.

=== Bed V ===
This bed contains fossilized bone and considerable rockfall debris. Cultural material recovered includes a grinder and the remains of a colored pigment. M.J Melhman attributed this bed to what he called the transitional "Mumba Industry" which contains both hallmarks of the Middle and Late Stone Ages. However, after reanalysis of Bed V, several archaeologists have suggested that the assemblages found within are better assigned exclusively to Late Stone Age technology. Radiocarbon dates on artifacts are estimated at 31,070 ± 500 B.P.

=== Bed VI ===
Bed VI contains the least amount of bone of all beds of the site, all of which are heavily fossilized. However, there is a large amount of naturally occurring raw materials and associated quartz artifacts. Furthermore, stone tools associated with the Sanzako Industry are present within the bed's assemblage. The Sanzako industry includes sided and notched scrapers, as well as are what described as "heavy duty" choppers and bifaces. Radiocarbon dates on available material are from 19820 ± 750 B.P.

== Lithics ==
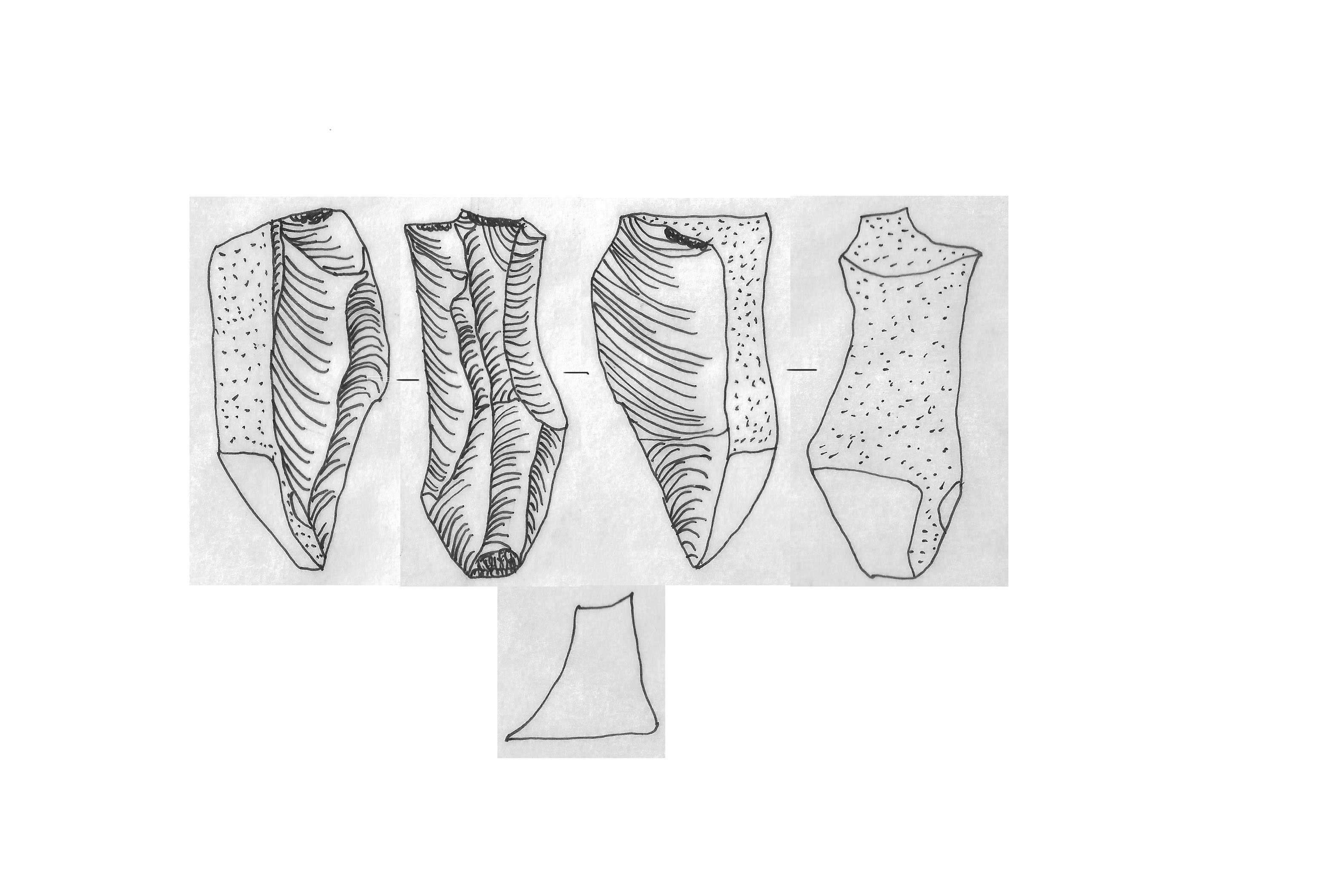
An obsidian core that has had flakes removed using bipolar percussion.

Recent archaeological experiments have confirmed that bipolar flaking, a form of lithic reduction, was used in the cave. These experiments further suggest that the site contains evidence for a transitional period between the Middle and Late Stone Age. Bipolar flaking is described as a hammer and anvil technique of stone tool production; it is an expedient process that produces significantly smaller flakes. This process has been an area of particular interest at Mumba, since there are a significant number of these smalls flakes between stratigraphic Beds VI to V and then in a plateau from Beds V to III. It is believed that the increase of bipolar reduction is a response to favorable climate change in the area, which lead to increased populations.

== Faunal remains ==
Mumba's geographic location may have been a strong factor in determining the overall appeal of the site to its past inhabitants. Along with the nearby lake, the cave is surrounded by various types of terrain including the Serengeti Plains to the west, as well as the Mubulu and Yada Highlands to the east. This diversity in environment brings with it an abundance of biodiversity. Presence of tilapia and catfish bones suggests both served as food resources, as well as snails confirmed by the presence of shell middens. These middens also suggests that Lake Eyasi had once reached to just outside the cave. Additionally, after paying closer attention to the faunal remains, several archaeologists have been able to conclude that the Mumba's past inhabitants took advantage of the terrestrial environment as well. Bones of several animals including baboons, rabbits, warthogs, dik-diks, lizards, and snakes have been found at the site suggesting exploitation of the nearby grassland, and terraces.

== Human remains ==
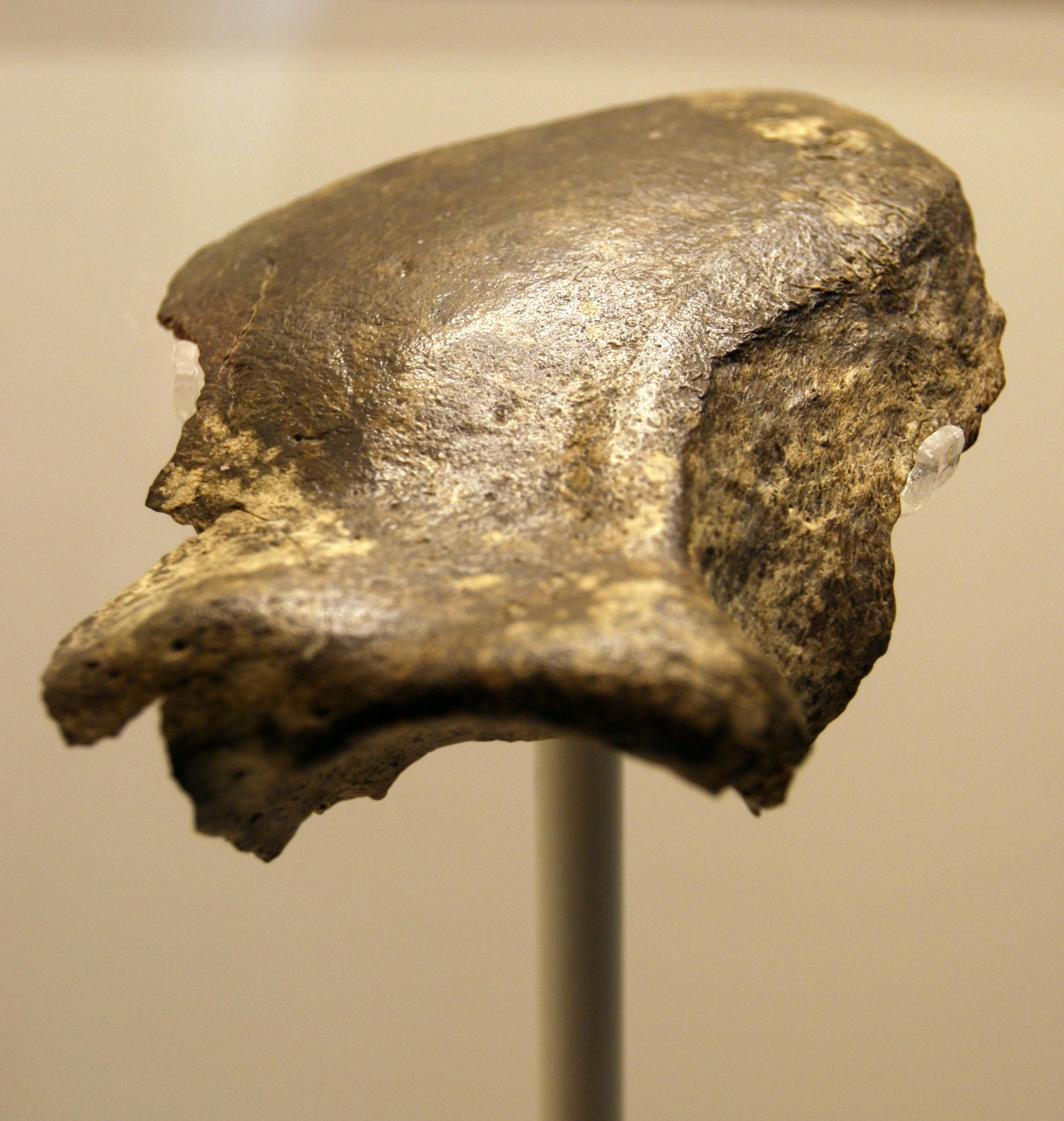
The frontal bone, Eyasi Hominin 6

Upon the excavation of Bed III the remains of eighteen individuals were discovered between 1934 and 1938. This discovery included twelve males, one female, three children, and two unknown individuals ranging from as young as two up to sixty years of age. Later examination of the available cranial remains revealed that these individuals exhibited Negroid characteristics. Further analysis, attention to context, and dating of the remains suggest these individuals lived in the time period between the start of the Late Stone Age to the start of the Iron Age and that they were most likely the makers of the Kansyore Pottery and ostrich eggshell beads found at the site.

== Contextual significance ==
Mumba is recognized for its potential in providing evidence for a gradual change between the Middle Stone Age and Late Stone Age in Africa. This is an important time period in human evolution, because many scholars believe that between the Middle and Late Stone Age is when the origin of modern human behavior began. Characteristics of modern human behavior include an increase in cognitive ability, evidence for the use of symbolism, and the origin of language. Examples of modern human behavior at the site include the presence of red ochre, the lithic artifacts, the wall art on the caves, and the overwhelming number of ostrich eggshell beads. The idea of Mumba Cave being an example of this transition was supported by M.J. Melhman and his formation of what he called the Mumba Industry that was largely based on the artifacts observed in Bed V. Archaeologists, however, still debate the validity of the Mumba Industry today.

== See also ==
- National Historic Sites in Tanzania
