= Njoro River Cave =

Archaeological site on tha Mau escarpment, Kenya

- location in Kenya
- 0°38′47″N 36°3′15″E
- Location: Mau Escarpment
- Region: Kenya

Site notes
- Excavation dates: 1938
- Archaeologists: Mary Leakey, Louis Leakey

Njoro River Cave is an archaeological site on the Mau Escarpment, Kenya, that was first excavated in 1938 by Mary Leakey and her husband Louis Leakey. Excavations revealed a mass cremation site created by Elmenteitan pastoralists during the Pastoral Neolithic roughly 3350-3050 BP. Excavations also uncovered pottery, beads, stone bowls, basket work, pestles and flakes. The Leakeys' excavation was one of the earliest to uncover ancient beads and tools in the area and a later investigation in 1950 was the first to use radiocarbon dating in East Africa.

== Dating ==
The Njoro River Cave was the place of first use of radiocarbon dating in East Africa. Though the Leakeys only made a single observation in 1950, later tests were conducted in the 1980s. Results from four total radiocarbon dates cluster at 3350-3050 BP.

== Cremation and burial ==
Seventy-eight individuals were originally recovered. While there is nothing that would suggest the items were only left for certain genders, the number of male remains found doubled the amount of female remains. Each body was buried with some type of potsherd, basket, bead, stone bowl, pestle, gourd or other various items. It appears the bodies underwent a series of steps to complete the ritual. First the bodies were wrapped in skins. They were then bound and covered with soil before the burning took place. Then a hole was dug into the ground and the body was placed into the hole. They were covered with soil and red ochre. Then a fire was lit on top, creating an oven atmosphere and leaving the remains in various states.

== Beads ==
The site contained thousands of beads made of semi-precious stones including agate, quartz, chalcedony and microcline. Before this excavation, beads such as these were thought to have been imported. Despite the fact many of the beads were burned for ceremonial purposes and lost their color, many of the excavated pieces kept their shape.

== Pottery and baskets ==
Although many pottery pieces were found, they were only able to rebuild two pots. 78 stone vessels were recovered. There were several different types of bowls found, including platters and shallow basins, pestle-rubbing, deep bowls, round-and flat-based, convex-sided bowls with sharp rims, oblong and oval bowls. These patterns were more ornate than others in the region.
