= Prospect Farm (Kenya) =

Archaeological site in Kenya

Prospect Farm is an archaeological site on the northern side of Mt. Eburru that has been known to show evidence of prehistoric inhabitants. Excavations have uncovered tool-based artifacts that date to the Middle Stone Age, Later Stone Age, and Pastoral Neolithic that were recognized to be a unique Prospect Industry style. Additionally, bowls were found of the Savanna Pastoral Neolithic. With the large amounts of artifacts found, current work lies in using forms of dating like radiocarbon dating and obsidian hydration to understand the specifics of when these artifacts originated, as well as when the land was used. Current research seeks to build upon this by trying to understand how inhabitants of the Prospect Farm interacted with other groups.

== Geography and surrounding area ==
Prospect Farm is an archaeological site on the northern slope of Mt. Eburru, in Nakuru County, which is in the southwest region of Kenya. Mt. Eburru is a part of a greater complex of volcanoes, and the ash deposits from said volcanoes have been helpful in the dating process for Prospect Farm and the surrounding areas. Prospect Farm is a part of the Kenya Rift valley. The site is located in the Nakuru-Naivasha basin, and is in close proximity to Lake Nakuru, Lake Elmenteita, and Lake Naivasha. The positions of these lakes are often used as reference points for naming certain regions of the site. In the present day, the area is not occupied. However, it is near multiple small cities and is near Nairobi.

== Previous research ==
The first significant amount of discoveries on Prospect Farm took place in the 1960s, under the supervision of George Kleis, the former estate manager of the Farm. Kleis led this research with Louis Leakey and Glynn Isaac of the Center for Prehistory and Paleontology in Nairobi. Also on the team was Barbara Whitehead Anthony, a former researcher at the center, who conducted a lot of the early work on the site. Excavations categorized the Farm into three Localities (I, II, and III). In total, these Localities were found to have contained over 30,000 artifacts.

=== Stone tool artifacts ===
Research at the localities revealed ample stone tools from the Middle Stone Age, Late Stone Age. Originally grouped in with the entirety of Eastern African Stillbay style, Anthony created the category of “Prospect Industry” to describe the unique tool style of Prospect Farm. Prospect Industry tools are described as having unifacially-worked points in addition to the bifacially-worked points and Levallois product style of East African Stillbay. Anthony then divided the Prospect Industry into four Phases (I, II, III, and IV) based on the age of the artifact. A survey of the site's levels reveal that obsidian was the choice material for tool-making. The majority of stone tools were found in Localities I and II.

=== Bowl artifacts ===
Pastoral Neolithic bowls were also found at the site, and they are in the style of Savanna Pastoral Neolithic (formerly known as Stone Bowl Culture) style. These bowls were found in Localities I and III.

== Present research ==
In 2003, new fieldwork began in the area, sponsored by the University of Nairobi. In 2014, an excavation by Goldstein and Munyiri found lithic artifacts at a higher, more northeastern slope of Mt. Eburru. Through the examination of the obsidian artifacts on the site, scholars believe Prospect Farm served as an obsidian quarry during the Pastoral Neolithic. Examinations of obsidian artifacts indicate at least sixteen different petrological groups are present at the site. Scholars believe this suggests that the inhabitants of Prospect Farm interacted with other groups, with the furthest being at least 50 kilometers away.

Gaps in the research include conflicting results from carbon and obsidian-based dating that suggest conflicting periods of earliest inhabitance of the site. Some of this difficulty is due to weather's effects on the site and the location of artifacts. Additionally, scholarship hasn’t confirmed a clear timeline of the area's usage. There are aims to address this through dating artifacts with methods separate from obsidian hydration and radiocarbon dating. Lastly, there is not a clear understanding of how and why the Prospect Farm inhabitants interacted with other human groups to acquire the non-local obsidian.
