= Gucha =

Gucha may refer to:

- Gucha River, a river in Kenya
- Gucha District, in western Kenya
- English transcription for Guča, a town in western Serbia, with its yearly
  - Guča trumpet festival
