= Narosura =

- Location within Kenya
- Coordinates: 1.53°S 35.87°E
- Country: Kenya
- County: Narok County
- Time zone: UTC+3 (EAT)

Narosura is a settlement in Kenya's Narok County in Narok South district approximately 42 miles south of Narok Town. The people living around Narosura are predominantly pastoralist Maasai, some of whom also practice irrigation agriculture.

Narosura has come to be known as a hub of commerce and horticulture. Narosura also boasts a large concentration of university graduates complemented by a large number of skilled professionals in Maasailand. Important community institutions include a public-run health center, several churches and schools.

Narosura is the location of an important Pastoral Neolithic archaeological site. This is the type site for "Narosura Ware" ceramics.

== Economy ==
Though located in the predominantly semi-arid plains at the foot of the Loita Hills, Narosurra Town is a modern commercial hub.

== Education ==
While Narosura has remained for decades without a high school, it is probable that it has the largest concentration of post-secondary educated residents. Until the establishment of Kuntai Primary School, the only primary school that offered primary school education to local children was Kanunka Primary School on the foot of the Loita Mountain range, about seven miles to the due south of Narosura Town.

== Narosura archaeological site ==
Archaeologists discovered an important Pastoral Neolithic site at Narosura in the early 1970s. The site was occupied by a Savanna Pastoral Neolithic pastoralist community c.3000-2000 BP. Narosura now serves as the type site for "Narosura Ware" ceramics, a distinctive style of pottery characterized by open bowls with comb-stamped decorations in bands near rims.

=== Site location and research history ===
The Narosura site is located in the Loita foothills, near the Narosura river and adjacent town. The site was first discovered by Dr. Alan H. Jacobs in 1968, after he observed cattle licking at partially covered bones. Excavations were done that year by him and Dr. Bernard Golden. In 1969, excavations were expanded by Knut Odner, who published the most detailed report for the site. Odner reports that at the time of excavation, the main tribal group inhabiting Narosura was the Maasai. The occupation area is an estimated 8400 square meter(s) rectangle and lies between the northern bank of the Narosura river and the main irrigation ditch. The site is only slightly above water level, making it susceptible to flooding while also providing fertile soil for cultivation. Over time the forest was replaced with cultivated fields, so the area could not be fully excavated. The main spaces excavated were the footpath and its surrounding area.

=== Excavation ===
The main excavation trench at Narosura measured about 22 square meters. Main features include postholes, fireplaces, and burnt clay. Postholes generally measuring 5–15 cm wide and 5–10 cm deep contain blackish soil, which was concentrated in the middle of the postholes. These features were interpreted as representing habitation structures, likely huts. Some of the postholes are patterned in a set of two rows, interpreted as belonging to an outer wall of a hut. Odner noted that the ground plan resembled present-day Maasai homes. The excavation trench also has three fireplaces: two oval-shaped ones with ashes and coal, and a main fireplace of sundried clay, raised edges, and with a flat interior. These fireplaces could not be linked to the hut. Concentrations of burnt clay within and outside the main fireplace suggest a structure was abandoned and burnt there. In summary, the excavations indicate that this was a habitation site.

=== Stratigraphy ===
The stratigraphy of the excavated trench was described as divided into five main layers. Layer I spans from 0-20/30 cm below the surface, II from 20/30-50/60 cm, III from 50/60-70/80 cm, IV from 70/80-90/100 cm, and V being anywhere below 90/100 cm. Features of each layer are as follows:

- Layer I: Grey-brown, sandy, non-compacted. Few finds
- Layer II: Grey-brown, sandy, compacted. Few finds. The first 20–30 cm below surface contained hard solid lumps, making it difficult to screen the soil.
- Layer III: Brown, heavily stained white or grey. Abundant finds, in particular animal bones.
- Layer IV: Similar to layer III, but more sandy. Abundant finds, in particular animal bones.
- Layer V: Sterile, sandy soil. No material.

Layer II’s higher compactness relative to Layer I is believed to be due to more intense human activity during Layer II’s period. No traces of Layer I can be found below the footpath. Local zones of gray deposits with charcoal and ashes were discovered 70–80 cm below and are believed to have been habitation floors. In area E-12, lumps of burnt clay were found in areas 20–70 cm below surface. These findings are believed to have belonged to a structure contemporary with the aforementioned habitations.

Throughout layers, lithics and vessels display little change in design or decoration. However, distribution of findings significantly varies. Based on the frequency of archaeological finds, Odner described two different stratigraphic zones: Zone A spans from the surface to 50/60 cm, encompassing layers I & II, and Zone B spans from 50/60 cm to 100 cm, encompassing layers III & IV. The kinds of finds are the same in both zones, but there are far more findings within Zone B (Layers III & IV). This is interpreted as evidence for accumulation of materials during a short time, perhaps one hundred years. Odner suggests “intense, but not necessarily permanent occupation.” Following that, the formation of Zone A is interpreted as more gradual, and potentially reflects more sporadic occupation.

While lithics and pottery display little change throughout layers, raw obsidian becomes increasingly common (78.7% of raw material 90–100 cm below, 92.3% 0-50 below) when moving closer to the surface as raw quartz & quartzite becomes correspondingly less common (14.8% of raw material 90–100 cm below, 5.6% 0-50 below).

=== Dating ===
Four charcoal samples were used for radiocarbon dating at the Institute of Physical and Chemical Research in Tokyo (RIKEN). Additionally, a date had been previously obtained from the same lab on animal bone collagen from 1968 test excavations. All five dates, when calibrated, fall within the early to middle third millennium before present, or about the 9th to 5th centuries BCE. These dates place the site within the Pastoral Neolithic period. Narosura is thus roughly contemporaneous with sites such as Prospect Farm in Kenya and Luxmanda in Tanzania. Given this early date, Narosura is an important site for understanding ancient pastoralist habitation and practices through its non-portable features such as postholes and fireplaces.

=== Ceramics ===
Pottery is abundant at Narosura. Kenyan archaeologist Simuyu Wandibba argued that it was most useful to categorize ceramics based on the analysis of specific attributes, such as shape and decoration, as it is less subjective than other types of categorization. Based on this analysis, Wandibba defined “Narosura ware” based upon the pottery found at this site, making it the type site. In his definition of the Narosura ware type, Wandibba noted that it had also been found across southern Kenya and northern Tanzania, including at Prospect Farm and at Crescent Island in Lake Naivasha. More recently, it was identified farther south at Luxmanda. All of these sites have been attributed to the Savanna Pastoral Neolithic tradition on the basis of Narosura ware pottery and other artifacts.

According to Odner and Wandibba, Narosura vessel shapes include both open- and narrow-mouthed bowls, as well as beaker-like vessels. These have a slightly concave-bottom shape, and are thick-walled with rounded lips. Narosura ware has unique decorative motifs. Depending on the vessel morphology, they are often decorated with incisions and comb stamp impressions. The incisions vary from incised-hatched bands, bands of vertical or diagonal hatching, bands of oblique comb-stamping, bands of pendant-triangles, and comb-stamped bands. Most of these decorations were applied prior to firing, except for drilled holes, which took place after firing.

=== Stone tools ===
A large variety of stone tools and other lithic artifacts were uncovered at Narosura, fitting into a few main categories. The majority of stone artifacts from Narosura fit into the category of flaked stone tools and the stone waste (debitage) created through their making. These artifacts were generally made of chert, high quality obsidian, and quartz; this is particularly interesting given that chert and obsidian are not local to Narosura. Geochemical characterization using x-ray fluorescence showed that most obsidian at Narosura came from the Ol Njorowa Gorge at Hell’s Gate National Park near Lake Naivasha, about 85 km from the site. The use of non-local materials at this site could indicate exchange networks.

There are several main groups of artifacts within this category: scrapers, borers, burins, backed flaked blades and bladelets, and geometric microliths. Geometric microliths stand out mainly due to their intricacy and the fact that there is some confusion regarding their use in the past. A reanalysis of some lithic artifacts from Narosura documented 215 geometric crescents, mainly made of obsidian. Despite their abundance, these artifacts had a low incidence of macrofractures typically associated with hunting, and the faunal remains at Narosura do not include large numbers of wild animals. Therefore, there are still a lot of questions as to how past peoples used them.

There are also some ground stone artifacts present at Narosura. Three fragmentary stone bowls were found, one made of consolidated lava-ash, and one made of gneiss. These bowls are notable as they are a common Savanna Pastoral Neolithic artifact. Also present at the site are some grindstones and pestle rubbing stones.

Along with stone tools, there were also a few bone awls and one bone needle found at Narosura.

=== Faunal remains ===
Faunal remains are abundant at Narosura, permitting zooarchaeological analysis. Analysis published in 1972 made Narosura the first reported site of the Savanna Pastoral Neolithic to show evidence of animal husbandry; since that time, many other sites have shown the importance of pastoralism in this time period.

R.M. Gramly identified remains of an estimated 149 animals (the Minimum Number of Individuals). Around 137 out of the total 149 animals attested were ruminants (mostly cattle and caprine, also wildebeest and dik-dik), with the remaining individuals being equids (zebra and/or donkey), rhinoceros, warthog, birds, and elephant. A later reanalysis by J. Kimengich and Diane Gifford-Gonzalez led to different numbers and showed additional taxa were present including gazelle, waterbuck, and giraffe. However, the overall interpretation of an assemblage dominated by domestic livestock remained intact.

Some of the bones show evidence of butchering with flaked stone tools, while dental analysis has been interpreted as showing evidence of probable cattle milking. The large wild animals such as elephant and rhinoceros were hypothesized to be primarily used for their parts. The presence of ivory at related Pastoral Neolithic sites suggests that it may have been an important item of exchange.

==== Analysis of herding strategies ====
Faunal remains were analyzed in multiple studies to determine herd composition and culling patterns of herding practices in the Pastoral Neolithic era. Recent work suggests that for cattle, these animals were slaughtered at many different ages, whereas for sheep and goats, they were mainly slaughtered as older juveniles and mature adults. This suggests that sheep and goats were slaughtered in their prime, whereas at least some cattle were kept well into their older years, perhaps for milking and/or breeding. Herd management via culling relatively healthy herds may have developed as a way to maximize profitability from the dwindling resources of the area for cows and calves.

==== Animal health ====
Dental enamel hypoplasias indicate stress events, such as infection or low resource availability. Dental analysis reveals relatively lower rates of hypoplasia in the herded cattle and caprines of Narosura compared to other Pastoral Neolithic sites nearby. The lower rates of severe dental hypoplasia may evidence herding practices that culled younger, prime-aged populations from the herd so that resources were reserved for specific herd members, such as female livestock or calves.

==== Stable isotope analysis ====
Stable isotope analysis of cattle herded in Narosura revealed lower ^{13}C values in these cattle than in cattle from other pastoralist sites in nearby areas of Kenya. Cattle in Narosura were likely either consuming grasses typical of arid environments to a greater degree, were participating in some foraging activities, and/or were grazing at higher elevations.
