= Luxmanda =

National Historic Site of Tanzania

- Site location in Tanzania
- 4°15′24″S 35°18′38″E
- Type: Settlement
- Periods: Neolithic
- Location: Babati District, Manyara Region, Tanzania
- Region: Eastern Africa

Site notes
- Condition: Critically Endangered
- Owner: Tanzanian Government
- Management: Antiquities Division, Ministry of Natural Resources and Tourism

National Historic Sites of Tanzania
- Official name: Luxmanda Prehistoric Site
- Type: Cultural

Luxmanda is an archaeological site located in the north-central Babati District of Tanzania. It was discovered in 2012. Excavations in the area have identified it as the largest and southernmost settlement site of the Savanna Pastoral Neolithic (SPN), an archaeologically recognized pastoralist culture centered in eastern Africa during a time period known as the Pastoral Neolithic (ca. 5000–1200 BP). Radiocarbon dating of charcoal, human collagen, and organic matter in ceramic artifacts indicate that Luxmanda was occupied between 3,200 and 2,900 years ago. Ceramics (of the Narosura type), lithics, worked bone, ivory, and ostrich eggshell assemblages in addition to livestock and human bones have been recovered from the Luxmanda site. Large grinding stones have also been found, though their function remains uncertain.

The people of Luxmanda were highly specialized pastoralists, relying on cattle, sheep, goats, and donkeys for subsistence. Their linguistic affiliation is unknown, but some historical linguists have speculated that the peoples of the SPN spoke Cushitic languages similar to Iraqw language still spoken in the area. The Pastoral Neolithic was followed by the Pastoral Iron Age and the Bantu Expansion.

== Ancient DNA analysis ==
Admixture clustering analysis of a 3,100-year-old female infant skeleton exhumed at Luxmanda found that the individual carried approximately 38±1% of her ancestry related to the Pre-Pottery Neolithic culture of the Levant. New genetic data from Luxmanda suggest that this affinity is likely due to either migration into Africa of descendants of Pre-Pottery Neolithic B farmers from the Levant, or common descent from an ancestral population that inhabited Africa or the Near East several millennia before. All the males tested for Y chromosomal DNA clustered with E1b1b subclades, with two yielding ambivalent A1b subclades due to insufficient collagen.

The African ancestry of Luxmanda was fitted as being most closely related to a hunter-gatherer population that inhabited Ethiopia ca. 4,500 BP (under a two-population admixture scenario, with inferred ancestry proportions of 62.2–62.8% for the hunter-gather component and 37.2–37.8% for the Pre-Pottery Neolithic B component). When using a three-population admixture scenario, the African part also showed contributions from a population related to the Dinka (with then an inferred ancestry proportion of 39% ± 1% for Levantine-related ancestry). Furthermore, haplogroup analysis indicated that the Luxmanda specimen bore the haplogroup L2a1 (mtDNA). Scientists had previously dated the arrival of Western Eurasian-related ancestry in eastern Africa, which is now pervasive in the region, to around 3000 BP on average. The new genetic data suggest that the makers of the Savanna Pastoral Neolithic were responsible for spreading ancient Levant-related ancestry in the lacustrine region, where they had established new settlements. The Luxmanda individual's population also likely introduced herding to southern Africa, since a 1,200 year old pastoralist individual from the Western Cape was found to bear affinities with the Luxmanda sample.
