= Percy George Hamnall Boswell =

British geologist

Professor Percy George Hamnall Boswell OBE FRS FGS
- Boswell in 1945

Professor of Geology, Imperial College of Science and Technology
- In office 1930–1938

George Herdman Professor of Geology, University of Liverpool
- In office 1917–1930

Personal details
- Born: 7 August 1886 Woodbridge, Suffolk, England
- Died: 22 December 1960 (aged 74) Ruthin, Denbighshire, Wales

Percy George Hamnall Boswell (7 August 1886 – 22 December 1960) was a British geologist.

== Biography ==
Boswell was born in Woodbridge, Suffolk, the son of printer George James Boswell of Ipswich and Mary Elizabeth (née) Marshall) of Tasmania.

He developed an early interest in geology while at school in Ipswich through fossil collecting and visiting local museums. As a teen he founded the Ipswich and District Field Club, which led to his election to as a fellow of the Geological Society of London in 1907. However, possibly as a result of his explorations, he developed choroiditis in both his eyes at 18 and nearly went blind; he never fully regained sight in his right eye.

After earning his Bachelor of Science at London University, Boswell continued at Imperial College London, studying at the Royal College of Science and the Royal School of Mines under William Whitehead Watts. He joined the Royal College in 1914 as a demonstrator in geology but left three years later to become the first George Herdman chair of Geology at Liverpool University.

Boswell was invested as an Officer of the Order of the British Empire in the 1918 Birthday Honours for his work during the Great War, as Geological Adviser to the Ministry of Munitions. During the war, he investigated British supplies of moulding sands for use in metal foundries and ultimately became "a recognized authority as a sedimentary petrologist."

In 1930, he returned as a professor to London University. He spent several decades working as an adviser for the Metropolitan Water Board on the matter of the falling water table under London.

His work as a geologist covered many aspects, but according to his obituary in The Times, his best contributions were possibly concerning recent geology of East Anglia, "where he was a pioneer in making sense of the stratigraphy of the area with its record of alternate advances and retreats of ice."

He was elected a Fellow of the Royal Society in May 1931 and was president of the Geological Society of London from 1940 to 1941. In 1934, he visited Africa to validate Louis Leakey's claim that he had found fossil remains of Homo sapiens more than 100,000 years old and publicly disagreed with Leakey's conclusions.

He died in Ruthin, Wales, in 1960.
