= Gogo Falls =

- Location in Kenya
- 0°54′S 34°35′E
- Periods: Neolithic
- Cultures: Elmenteitan
- Associated with: ancient pastoralist peoples
- Location: Kenya
- Region: Migori County

Site notes
- Elevation: 1,296 m (4,252 ft)
- Excavation dates: since 1983
- Archaeologists: Karega-Munene, Samuel Kahinju

Gogo Falls is an archaeological site near a former and, since 1956, dammed waterfall, located in the Lake Victoria Basin in Migori County, western Kenya. This site is important to archaeology as it includes some of the earliest appearances of artifacts and domestic animals in the area. The findings at the site help to reconstruct the later prehistory around Lake Victoria, including a Pastoral Neolithic occupation by Elmenteitan peoples and a later Iron Age occupation. Artifacts found at the site included pottery and iron artifacts. Through these artifacts some of the cultural traditions of the people who lived near Gogo Falls were discovered.

== Location and environmental setting ==
Gogo Falls is located in the Lake Victoria Basin in Kenya. Gogo Falls is located on the Kanyamkago Hillside near the modern dam on the West bank of Gucha River (also known as Kuja River). The Kanyamkago Hills were formed out of Pre-Cambrian rocks. The modern dam is fairly close to Gogo Falls but it did not form any of the falls in the area; the falls were all formed naturally. The falls were a good place to collect fish because they offered easy access to those who resided in the area.

== History of research ==
The first archaeologist to work in the Lake Victoria region of Kenya was Archdeacon W. E. Owen; he later enlisted the help of Louis Leakey. After their work, there were a few caves that were excavated but they did not present any important artifacts. That was the extent of the work done in the Lake Victoria Basin until 1980 when Peter Robertshaw started his work in Gogo Falls. Robertshaw and David Collett visited Gogo Falls in 1981, they found that some of the ground had been disturbed due to work on the local dam. From the visible disturbance they found the ground had archaeological evidence that should be further examined. The items found were ash midden that included Oltome pottery (Kansyore pottery), faunal remains and stone artifacts. There were cattle teeth found in the area but through further research it appeared that the cattle and the pottery were not related. Robertshaw returned to Gogo Falls in 1983 to further excavate the site with new trenches located in different areas of the falls. In 1989, Karega-Munene excavated Gogo Falls on a larger scale using similar excavations techniques to Robertshaw’s in 1983.

== Research and excavation strategy ==
In 1983, Robertshaw dug five trenches of varying sizes about 2m x 2m. The strategy for excavation of the five trenches included the removal of topsoil with picks and shovels. Once below the topsoil, trowels were used for the remainder of the excavations. The deposit was then separated in 10 cm deep units which were then identified by both a number and letter. After the deposit was separated into units, it was then dry-sieved using a sieve with 5 mm mesh.

The 1989 excavations of this area were conducted by Karega-Munene. The excavation decided to focus on the area that was adjacent to the river. They established a grid that resulted in 52 squares, each measured 5m x 5m. There were two plots that produced the most finds and they were identified as Area A. After those plots provided so many finds they excavated more squares in that area which were labeled 1 through 30. The excavations of these squares were different from Robertshaw’s excavations because the topsoil was not removed by shovels, but instead separated into 10 cm spits.

== Dating ==
Different types of dating were used at Gogo Falls. Archaeologists sent small charcoal samples to the University of Oxford to be radiocarbon dated. However, the samples of charcoal found were less than 30g, which meant the dates were only average dates because the samples were smaller than what was needed to obtain an exact date. The samples were not able to give exact dates because they could have come from the levels above or below the level that was being dated. Even though the samples had minor problems for obtaining dates, they were the best option for dates in those levels. However, there were items that were dated using this method that did support the understanding of the site. The dates found did not always match the stratigraphy but the dates themselves were not statistically different. The other technique used to date items in Gogo Falls was obsidian hydration. For the excavations in 1983, J.W. Michele performed the obsidian hydration dating at MOHLAB. There were also problems with this kind of dating because rates of hydration are not always constant enough to date correctly. The date of an item could change based on how much sunlight that it receives and the chemical composition that is in its environment. Some dates of samples that were found did not match because there was a 1500-year gap between the two and some of the other dates were older than the ones that were found in deeper layers. However, there were other dates that showed stratigraphic consistency because there were layers in the trenches that showed the deeper levels were older than the ones above it. The dates that were attained from the excavations date to about 2000 BP and range between the years of 1510-990 BC and AD 4 and AD 410.

== Finds ==
There were many different items excavated at Gogo Falls, found were ash midden, Akira pottery, Kansyore pottery, Elementeitan pottery, Urewe pottery, iron artifacts, regular shells beads, ostrich eggshell beads, faunal remains, stone artifacts and charcoal. The stone Artifacts include obsidian, quartz, small microliths and modified blades of different sizes. In 1989, the excavations found more stone artifacts that had been found earlier but they also found arrowheads. In 1983, there were some bone artifacts found, including one possible harpoon, which would make it the first in the Lake Victoria Basin. The faunal remains include mammalian fauna which were bones and teeth from cattle, fish bones which were believed to be the first associated with Elementeitan pottery, shellfish and botanical remains. Based on evidence, Gogo Falls was a site for herding cattle, sheep and goats. People at Gogo Falls also hunted; bones of zebra, warthog, bush pig, and oribi were found at the site. Finds were spread throughout the different areas that were excavated but all of the areas were consistent with the others.

== Discussion ==
Gogo Falls helps archaeologists today because based on recent studies of stable isotopes of animal teeth, a path has been found that would have allowed people to travel to South Africa. Since it is known that there were large numbers of domestic animals and wild animals at the site, this proves that there was no tsetse flies in the area. If there were tsetse flies, then there would not have been evidence of herding in Gogo Falls. The stable isotopes also prove that the area had been covered in grasses for the last 2000 years due to the increase of rainfall in the later Holocene, the environment was ideal to have supported domestic animals. This evidence helps prove that there could have been a movement of people from eastern Africa to southern Africa, because the main source of food for people were animals and they would have had to travel through areas that animals could survive.

== See also ==
- Elmenteitan
