= Kansyore Pottery =

Kansyore pottery is a type of ancient East African pottery.

Archaeological sites with Kansyore pottery are the only hunter-gatherer sites associated with large quantities of ceramics in East Africa before the advent of food production between 3000 and 2000 BC. Furthermore, archeologists Dale and Ashley have proposed earlier dates that suggest the Kansyore people were among the earliest ceramic-using hunter-gatherers in East Africa.

Research into Kansyore culture has suggested that the culture differs from other known East African Late Stone Age hunter-gatherers (LSA). The Kansyore communities of the LSA are marked by ceramics and a settlement pattern based on the exploitation of resources from the shorelines of lakes or rivers. This utilization of aquatic resources may have fostered a sedentary culture and the production of Kansyore pottery.

== Geographic distribution and context ==
Kansyore ceramics have been found in East Africa (Kenya, Uganda, Tanzania, and southeastern Sudan) and throughout the Lake Victoria basin. Most sites associated with Kansyore pottery are near bodies of water, such as rivers or lakes. Assemblages are “loosely concentrated” around Lake Victoria, including sites at the following locations:

- Gogo Falls, Kenya
- Usenge, Kenya
- Siror, Kenya
- Northern Tanzania

The concentration of Kansyore pottery in geographical areas associated with water is indicative of the hunter-gatherers' lifestyles. This settlement pattern suggests a specialized subsistence economy based on aquatic food. Furthermore, the subsistence strategy of fish and shellfish is the result of seasonal exploitation of food sources: river sites were exploited for fishing during the wet season [1], while lake sites were exploited during the dry season for the collection of shellfish and easily caught fish.

== Typology: Description of pottery ==
Kansyore pottery's uniqueness is a result of applied tools and techniques. This caused the design of the pottery to display distinct decorations that covered most of the exterior surface. The vessels themselves run a spectrum from medium-sized to hemispherical bowls with varying rim designs, such as rounded, tapered, and occasionally spurred. To classify, Dale developed an approach to identify Kansyore pottery:

- Four techniques: appliqué, incision, rocker, and simple impression.
- Eight motifs: serrated-edge, serrated-edge zigzag, plain-edge zigzag, punctate, punctate circular motif, appliqué, incision, and impression.

Within each of these categories certain techniques were applied to achieve the desired design. For example, in the appliqué technique clay pieces were attached to the clay body in circular or oblong shapes, yet within the motifs categories were many variations.

=== Gogo Falls collection ===
The Kansyore collection from Gogo Falls is the largest known example of well-preserved Kansyore pottery, and it has been used as a reference for comparisons. Collett and Robertshaw applied the Kansyore collection from Gogo Falls to resolve classification issues with ceramics from Kantsyore Island, Nyang'oma, and Mumba-Hohle.

- Kantsyore Island
  - All the sherds from Kantsyore Island depicted the same style as the collection from Gogo Falls.
- Nyang'oma
  - All of the sherds can be assigned to the Kansyore assemblage.
- Mumba-Hohle
  - Because some the pottery includes different stylistic qualities, such as aerial motifs, only some of the pottery, that depict panels and multiple bands of vertical punctates, may belong to the Kansyore tradition.

Thus, the ceramic assemblages found at the sites stated above belong to the Kansyore tradition. This cannot be said for other ceramic assemblages. For instance, it was believed that Kansyore pottery was discovered at the Lukenya Hill and Salasun sites. However, Collett and Robertshaw used the Gogo Falls collection as a reference, and were able to subscribe the ceramics in the central Rift Valley to the Nderit tradition.

- Lukenya Hill
  - Ceramics depicted either a dragged comb or twisted cordroulette style that does not match the Kansyore tradition.
- Salasun
  - The Salasun assemblage has not been fully described, though at least part of the assemblage has been assigned to the Nderit tradition.

The above-mentioned comparisons show that some assemblages have been wrongly identified as the Kansyore entity.

== Associations and non-ceramic artifacts ==
Significant non-ceramic artifacts found associated with Kansyore pottery are:

- Shell middens
- Personal adornment at Usenge, Pundo, and Siror
- Rounded pebble at Pundo
- Lithics
- Bone points

=== Associated ceramic artifacts ===
- Urewe ware
- Early Iron Age ceramic
- Nderit

The fact that Kansyore pottery was found in varying contexts and with other artifacts illustrates transition and change. This is seen in the Early Phase of the Kansyore. To illustrate, 8 rounded pebbles were found in one test pit at Pundo, their function range from grinding red ochre to grinding plants. Bone points used for fishing were discovered at Usenge 1 and Pundo, and personal adornment, such as bone or shell beads, were found at Usenge 1, Pundo, and Siror. Thus, the non-ceramic artifacts indicate that specialized materials were already being made before the introduction of pottery.

== Chronology ==
The chronology for Kansyore has been a source of discourse for many archaeologists. Dates for Kansyore cover 6000 years with the earliest dates, 7819 to 6590 cal. BC, coming from Luanda in Kenya, while the latest dates, AD 1-120, coming from Wadh Lang'o.

=== Discussing chronology and typology ===
The overbearing time frame of the dates briefed above has caused many to question the validity of the Kansyore tradition. D.P Collett and P.T. Robertshaw assert that "dates associated with Kansyore assemblages cover a long period." Their recounting of Mehlmans' skepticism, however, results from the fact that "either a very conservative tradition or large dating errors" disallow for accurate chronology. Evidence suggest that the former reasoning is the cause for the chronology, and the dating for Kansyore pottery from East Africa suggest that it was a long lived tradition.

Chronology is important to Dale's and Ashley's research. With their findings, they were able to ascertain two phases of the Kansyore tradition. First is the Early Phase, which was 5468-5299 cal. BC. Second is the Late Terminal Kansyore Phase, which dates to the mid-second millennium BC and terminal second early first millennia cal BC.

The Early Phase is illustrated at sites such as Siror, Pundo, and Usenge 1. In Siror dated material corroborate with Dale's and Ashley's sequence of the Early Phase. For example, a radiocarbon date of charcoal, found in Trench 1, is dated to 5468-5299 BC. The typology of ceramics found in the Early phase at Siror is the punctate motif, while the Late Terminal phase shows a high frequency of the rocker-stamp motif. The Late Terminal Kansyore Phase is identified at Usenge 3 and Trench 2 in Siror. Again, artifacts radiocarbon dates, ranging from 3310 +/1 40 BP and 3240 +/- 70 BP, supports Dale's sequence of the Kansyore tradition. Missing in the sequence is a phase for the middle Kansyore period because more research is needed to develop a full picture of change, yet the dating provided by the sequence allows reconstruction of the Kansyore tradition.

== Lifeways of the Early and Late Kansyore phases ==
Research into the Kansyore has provided more insight into the lifeways of those who created the pottery. Artifacts, such as pottery, in which the originators are no longer tangible entities, allow archaeologists the ability to interpret it.

Dale and Ashley illustrate the difference between Early and Late Kansyore by using ceramic and non-ceramic archaeological material from Siror, and at the same time speak about the culture of the pottery makers. Thus, in the early phase of Siror, the large quantities of fish bones suggest that many people who had a fish-based subsistence economy occupied the site. As stated above, ceramic evidence at the early phase was punctate, but shifted to rocker-stamped motif in the later Kansyore period. With the shift in ceramic decoration, more emphasis on terrestrial mammals for subsistence became apparent.

The transition to the use of ceramics was not a swift transition. In fact, evidence shows that ceramic use was slowly applied and may have come after specialized subsistence economies. For instance, shell middens in Usenge 1 and Pundo show low ceramic density. Even more, non-ceramic artifacts, such as bone points, indicate that other material culture linked to specific activities and economies existed before ceramics. Nonetheless, even if the transition to ceramic use was slow and part of a process of change, by the Early Kansyore Phase, 5648-5299 cal. BC, it became a central part of the economy.

Evidence for a shift in subsistence economy and social relations in the Later Terminal Kansyore Phase is seen in Siror and Usenge 3. At these sites, a decline of fish resource exploitation is experienced and a rise in terrestrial mammals is emphasized. For example, in Usenge 3, the upper layers of deposit including terrestrial animals, such as cattle, overlaid a Kansyore shell midden. In addition to the terrestrial animals, the Kansyore ceramics in the upper layers of deposit depicted a decline in decoration and technological quality. This is taken as evidence for social contact with late hunter-gatherer-fishers and farming societies. Thus, in the Later Terminal Kansyore Phase, the fishing to hunting society was going through a local change brought on by contact with other societies.
