= Elmenteitan =

African Pastoral Neolithic culture

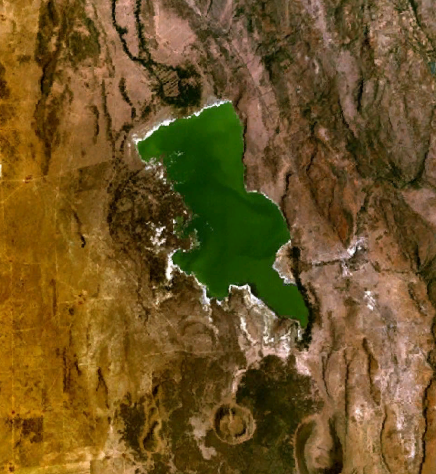
- Alternative names: Elmenteitan Culture
- Geographical range: Kenya, Africa
- Period: Neolithic
- Dates: c. 3300-1200 BP
- Type site: Gamble's Cave
- Major sites: Gamble's Cave, Ngamuriak, Gogo Falls, Njoro River Cave
- Preceded by: Later Stone Age peoples
- Followed by: Pastoral Iron Age peoples

The Elmenteitan culture was a prehistoric lithic industry and pottery tradition with a distinct pattern of land use, hunting and pastoralism that appeared and developed on the western plains of Kenya, East Africa during the Pastoral Neolithic c.3300-1200 BP. It was named by archaeologist Louis Leakey after Lake Elmenteita (also Elementaita), a soda lake located in the Great Rift Valley, about 120 km (75 mi) northwest of Nairobi.

== History of research ==
The Elmenteitan was first described by Louis Leakey from excavations at Gamble's Cave (the type site) in 1931 and Njoro River Cave in 1938. Leakey had noticed a locally distinct cluster of the lithic industry and a universal pottery tradition in a restricted area on the plains west of the central Great Rift Valley and at the Mau Escarpment.

== Sites and society ==
Elmenteitan sites are found between the central Rift Valley and the western Lake Victoria Basin of Kenya. The occupants of all these sites used obsidian sourced from Mount Eburu. They left behind distinctive lithic and ceramic traditions and practiced primarily cremation burial. This contrasts with the contemporaneous SPN pastoral tradition whose sites are found across a wider part of Kenya and Tanzania. Occupants of these sites used a variety of obsidian sources, had greater diversity in material culture, and mainly buried their dead in cairns. These findings suggest that the heterogeneous SPN category likely encompasses multiple groups.

== Artifacts and characteristics ==
At Elmenteitan sites, lithic assemblages are distinguished by a high percentage of long symmetrical two-edged obsidian blades. These blades, which sum up to 15–20 cm in length (among the largest in the Later Stone Age in Eastern Africa), were used unmodified and also served as blanks for a great variety of smaller microlithic tools.

Typical Elmenteitan artifact assemblages also include ceramic bowls and shallow stone vessels. Ceramic vessels are mainly undecorated. Several rare, but very distinctive ornamental designs such as irregular punctuation and rim millings have also been found. Occasionally small bowls with out-turned rims, handles with holes or horizontal lugs have been discovered as well.

Domestic cattle and small stock were raised and herded in combination with hunting, fishing and foraging. Patterns and degree of subsistence economy varied greatly depending on location and local and temporal climate. Regular cremation of the dead took place in caves (e.g. Egerton Cave, Keringet Caves). Njoro River Cave, first excavated in 1938 by Mary Leakey, served as a mass-burial site. Associated finds include beads, blades, stone bowls, palettes and pottery vessels.

== Physical anthropology ==
Instances of dental avulsion in some individuals from Elmenteitan burial sites has led to associations with the early spread of Southern Nilotic speaking groups into south-western Kenya. The exact direction from which they entered southern Kenya remains unclear. Recent genetic analysis of the ancient remains of Elmenteitan has proven that the population of the Savanna Pastoral Neolithic were also responsible for the pastoralist Elmenteitan culture that lived in the Rift Valley during the same period.

== See also ==
- Gogo Falls
- Ngamuriak

== Artifacts ==
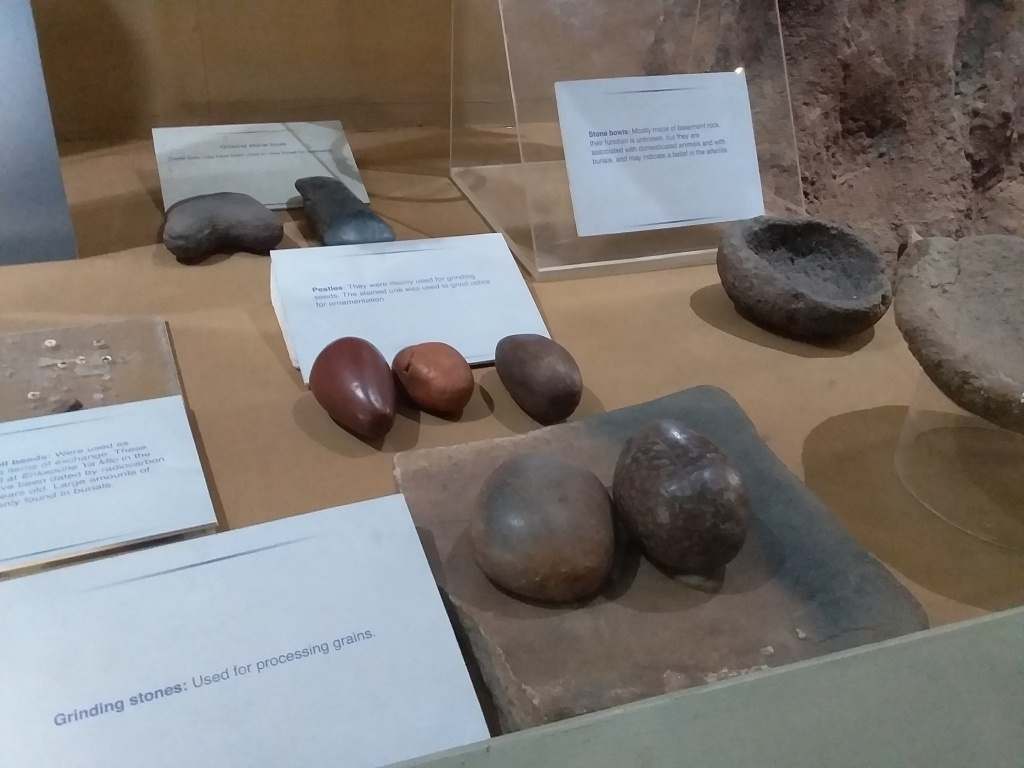
Grinding stones, pestles and axes of the East African Pastoral Neolithic

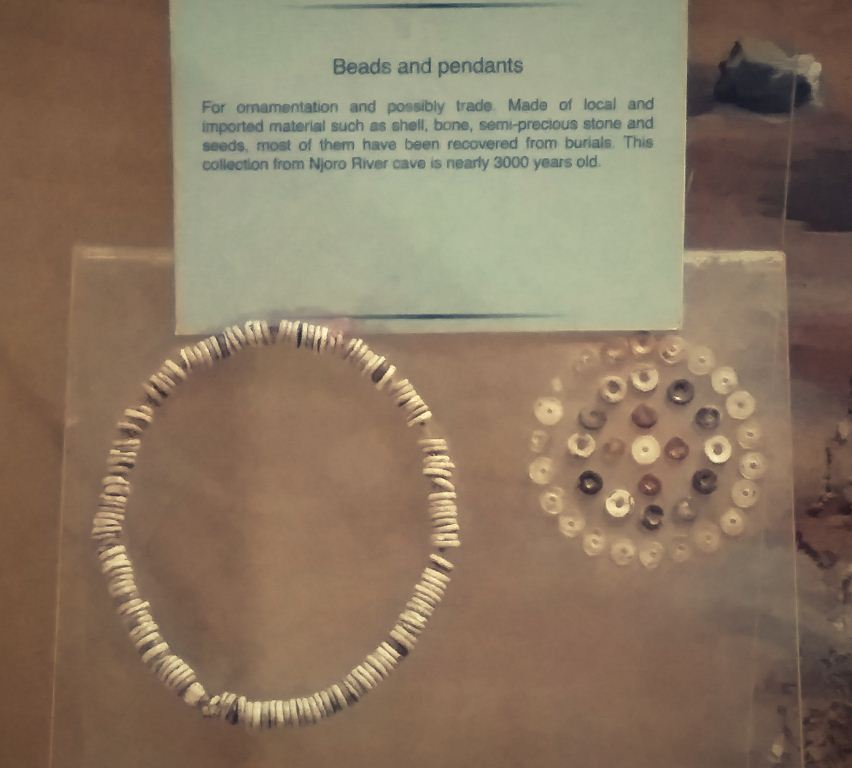
The beads and pendants forming this c. 3,000-year-old neck chain were among the finds at Njoro River Cave.
