= Ngamuriak =

Kenyan archaeological site

Ngamuriak is an archaeological site located in south-western Kenya. It has been interpreted as an Elmenteitan Pastoral Neolithic settlement. The excavation of this site produced pottery sherds, stone tools with obsidian fragments and obsidian blades, along with large amounts of animal bones.

== Location ==
Ngamuriak is located in what is now south-western Kenya, 3 kilometers east of the Lemek village. The site sits on a large and open plain that is covered in vegetation such as dwarf shrubs and grass. The area wildlife includes wildebeest, giraffes, gazelle, zebras, impalas, and warthogs.

== Excavation ==
Three seasons of excavation occurred at Ngamuriak, from July to October in 1981, November to December in 1984, and in April to May of the following year in 1985. The excavation itself was conducted using a grid system for the mapping, while trenches were dug in various sizes ranging from 2m x2m to almost 60 square meters. The first series of excavations were done with 2m x 2m trenches that formed a grid pattern, which allowed for more extensive trenches with exploited features and the retrieval of more artifacts and faunal remains.

Excavations conducted during the 1981 research produced a large amount of faunal remains, artifacts, and charcoal samples. During the 1984 excavation, similar forms of stratigraphy was used and resulted in more faunal remains and artifacts being discovered along with both charcoal and bone fragments. Excavation in 1985 yielded similar findings, along with dung deposits being found around the south-western region of Ngamuriak.

When the south-western area of Ngamuriak was excavated in 1981 a hardened clay surface was uncovered, which was used as a floor for a structure. Evidence for this is supported by the post holes that are found along the floor, which indicates that a hut was constructed at this location. Numerous animal dung deposits were also uncovered in the area of the site.

== Artifacts ==
The artifacts that are excavated from Ngamuriak vary from stone tools which contained obsidian blades or fragments, pottery sherds, and numerous faunal and charcoal remains.

Of the 62,000 faunal specimens that were studied only 4,656 were fully identified. A large amount of the identifiable bones came from domesticated animals, with 2,228 being identified as cattle and 2,404 belonging to sheep and goats. The cattle from the site have been identified as Bos indicus (zebu) or Bos indicus/Bos taurus crossbreeds.

=== Stone tools ===
A sample of 93 artifacts were obtained from a single area of a midden at Ngamuriak. These samples contained formal tools as well as secondarily modified pieces, cores/core fragments, along with flakes and fragments. Using XRF analysis on the obsidian artifacts show where one of the sources of the obsidian was collected from, with deposits coming from the central Rift Valley near Mt. Eburru.

=== Pottery ===
The stone artifacts and pottery sherds appear to be influenced by the Elmenteitan industry, a Pastoral Neolithic culture in East Africa. The pottery was being described as “Remnant Ware” or Elmenteitan based on the decorative style and shapes of the pottery. Elmenteitan pottery typology consists of two different types of hemispherical bowls with rims. The base could be conical. There can be stylistic variation regarding the location of spouts and lugs on these vessels. The location and form of some Remnant ware found at Ngamuriak could indicate that some spouts and lugs were not used for pouting, but were used to help suspension. Decoration could include punch holes, notching, incisions, and impressions. The use of Elementeitan could be traced back to over two thousand years ago. This type of ware is found in the central part of the Kenyan Rift Valley and contained in the areas of Mt. Eburru, Lake Nakuru, Gogo Falls, and Ngamuriak.

=== Livestock ===
In later Pastoral Neolithic sites, faunal remains from domestic species are usually abundant. Out of the 4,565 identified remains found, only 22 were identified as belonging to the wildlife that inhabited that area surrounding Ngamuriak. This reflects on how the inhabitants of Ngamuriak relied heavily on domestic animals for subsistence. This could represent a deliberate concentration on the exploitation on domestic herds, with very minimal hunting of wild animals for food. This strategy of food procurement is similar to the present Maasai pastoralists.

Evidence based on the caprine remains shows goats were culled at an early age. The high level of bone fragmentation found at the site suggest the inhabitants consumed nutrients within the animal bones and the animals were in good condition when they were slaughtered. The diet itself focuses mostly on high protein and low carbohydrate intakes, with livestock being the primary source of fat and protein and cultivation providing the low sources of carbohydrates.

The patterns in which the animals were killed indicate how the pastoralists at Ngamuriak managed their livestock. While cattle and caprine (sheep and goats) have different gains in weight, with cattle having a rapid rate in weight gain and caprine having a slower weight gain rate, both were commonly consumed when the animals reached their maximum weight.

== Dating ==
Radiocarbon dating indicates that the site was occupied at some point in time between the years of BC 198 to AD 59. Although the dating of the obsidian artifacts was not consistent with the charcoal samples, it allows speculations that the area of Ngamuriak was occupied at various times.
