= Savanna Pastoral Neolithic =

Archaeological cultures of the Rift Valley of East Africa

The Savanna Pastoral Neolithic (SPN; formerly known as the Stone Bowl Culture) is a collection of ancient societies that appeared in the Rift Valley of East Africa and surrounding areas during a time period known as the Pastoral Neolithic. They were South Cushitic speaking pastoralists who tended to bury their dead in cairns, whilst their toolkit was characterized by stone bowls, pestles, grindstones and earthenware pots.

Through archaeology, historical linguistics and archaeogenetics, they conventionally have been identified with the area's first Afroasiatic-speaking settlers. Archaeological dating of livestock bones and burial cairns has also established the cultural complex as the earliest centre of pastoralism and stone construction in the region.

== Overview ==
The makers of the Savanna Pastoral Neolithic culture are believed to have arrived in the Rift Valley sometime during the Pastoral Neolithic period (c. 3,000 BC-700 AD). Through a series of migrations from Horn of Africa, these early Cushitic-speaking pastoralists brought cattle and caprines southward from the Sudan and/or Ethiopia into northern Kenya, probably using donkeys for transportation. According to archaeological dating of associated artifacts and skeletal material, they first settled in the lowlands of Kenya between 5,200 and 3,300 ybp, a phase referred to as the Lowland Savanna Pastoral Neolithic. They subsequently spread to the highlands of Kenya and Tanzania around 3,300 ybp, which is consequently known as the Highland Savanna Pastoral Neolithic phase.

Excavations in the area indicate that the Savanna Pastoral Neolithic peoples were primarily cattle pastoralists. They milked this livestock, and also possessed goats, sheep, and donkeys. They typically buried their deceased in cairns. Their toolkit was characterized by a blade and bladelet-based lithic industry, earthenware pots, stone bowls and pestles, and occasional grindstones. The Savanna Pastoral Neolithic peoples sometimes hunted medium and large game on the plains, and during the culture's lowland phase, they likewise fished in Lake Turkana.

Sonia Mary Cole (1954) indicates that certain pestles and grindstones that she excavated from ochreous levels were stained with ochre, while others from the carbonized layers were not. She consequently suggests that the latter were instead used for grinding grain. Other scholars have argued that there is no direct archaeological evidence that SPN peoples cultivated grains or other plant domesticates.

Although detailed information on this segment of African prehistory is not abundant, data so far available reveal a succession of cultural transformations within the Savanna Pastoral Neolithic. The transformations seem to have been fostered by both environmental change and population movements. Among these changes was the apparent abandonment of the stone bowls at around 1,300 years before present.

Ancient DNA analysis of a Savanna Pastoral Neolithic bone excavated at the Luxmanda site in Tanzania found that the specimen carried a large proportion of ancestry related to the Pre-Pottery Neolithic culture of the Levant, similar to that borne by modern Afroasiatic-speaking populations inhabiting the Horn of Africa. This suggests that the Savanna Pastoral Neolithic culture bearers may have been Cushitic speakers. Further research has shown that the Pastoral Neolithic people, supported the previously identified three-component model: Chalcolithic and Bronze Age Levantine groups, Stone Age East African foragers, and individuals related to present-day Dinka.

== Language ==
The SPN peoples are believed to have spoken languages from the South Cushitic branch of the Afroasiatic. According to Christopher Ehret, linguistic research suggests that these Savanna Pastoral Neolithic populations were the first Afroasiatic speakers to settle in the Central Rift Valley and surrounding areas. The region was at the time of their arrival inhabited by Khoisan hunter-gatherers who spoke Khoisan languages and practiced an Eburran blade industry. Recent genetic analysis of ancient remains has proven that the population of the Savanna Pastoral Neolithic were also responsible for the pastoralist Elmenteitan culture that lived in the Rift Valley during the same period.

The linguistic chronology of the historic population movements into the Central Rift Valley as well as the present and past distribution of Afro-Asiatic speakers further suggests that SPN peoples likely spoke South Cushitic languages. Ehret (1998) proposes that among these idioms were the now extinct Tale and Bisha languages, which were identified on the basis of loanwords. These early Cushitic speakers in the region largely disappeared following the Bantu Expansion.

== Distribution ==
The Savanna Pastoral Neolithic culture was initially distributed at elevations below 1100 m in lowland northern Kenya (Lowland Savanna Pastoral Neolithic). Its range later extended to the highlands between central Kenya and northern Tanzania, at elevations above 1,500 m (Highland Savanna Pastoral Neolithic). The preferred settlement location for SPN sites was open wooded grassland on well-drained, gentle slopes of between 1,500 m to 2,050 m.

== Material culture ==
The Savanna Pastoral Neolithic makers' characteristic stone bowls have been recovered from their occupation sites and burial cairns.

Their material culture was typified by several pottery styles, up to three of which may be found at a single site. Early SPN herders in the Turkana Basin produced nderit pottery (previously known as Gumban A). The most diagnostic SPN pottery farther south is Narosura pottery, and some scholars group Akira (TIP), Maringishu (trellis motif), and herringbone-motif wares in with the SPN as well.

Regarding funerary tradition, the Savanna Pastoral Neolithic peoples erected stone cairns in open spaces, rock shelters, crevices or against walls. The deceased were buried with several items, including stone bowls, pestle rubbers and ochre palettes. Large obsidian blades and other tools were occasionally among the mortuary objects. Incisor removal was not a common feature of this population.
