= Gucha River =

Gucha - Migori Kuja
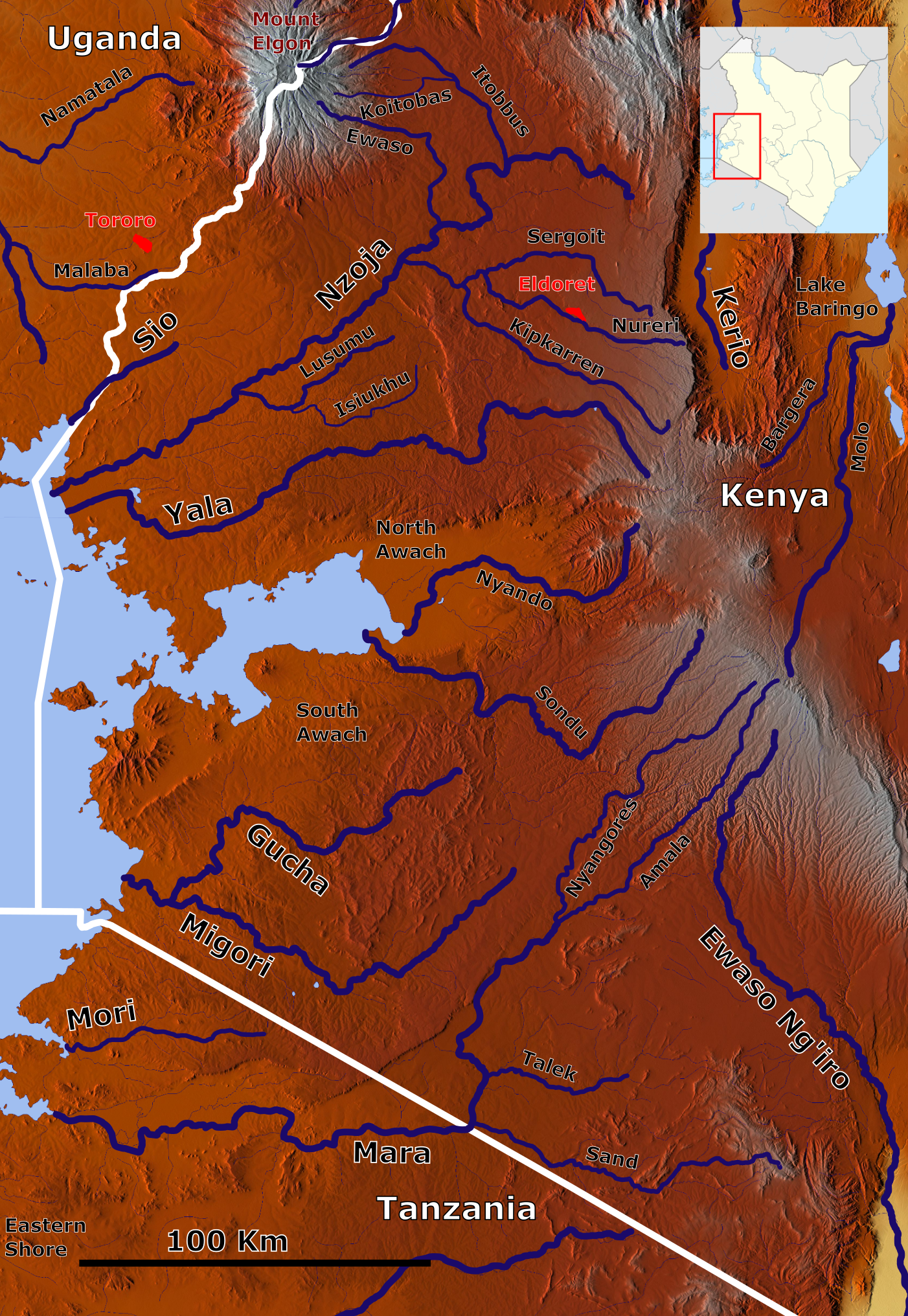
- Gucha River (center left)

Location
- Country: Kenya

Physical characteristics
- Source
  - location: Nyamira County
  - coordinates: 0.563813°S 34.993856°E
- Mouth: Lake Victoria
  - location: Migori County
  - coordinates: 0.905°S 34.144°E
- Length: 149 km (93 mi)
- Basin size: 6,900 km^{2} (2,700 sq mi)
- Discharge
  - average: 58 m^{3}/s (2,000 cu ft/s)

Basin features
- Tributaries
  - left: Sare River, Oyani River, Migori River, Ongoche River
  - right: Riana River

Gucha River, referred to as the River Kuja by the Luo community, originates in the highlands of Kiabonyoru in Nyamira County and passes through the heart of Gucha District, running west through Migori County where it joins the Migori River and flows as the Kuja-Migori River into Lake Victoria.

As the Gucha River runs across Gusiiland, the Mogonga River, which has a recognized history of dangerous flooding, flows into it. Mogonga and Gucha are approximately equal in size and meet just 1.6 kilometres (1 mi) before coursing through the Ogembo Town center.

Near the mouth of the Gucha-Migori, the river's course changed in 2001–2002, moving north to its present location.

About 45 kilometres (45,000 m) from Migori, the Gogo Falls dam was completed in 1956 with a hydropower capacity of 2MW, connected to the Kenyan national grid. The dam is operated by Kenya Electricity Generating Company (Kengen). In 2014, Kenyan government announced an upgrade to the dam, to increase capacity to 12MW, regulate flow to prevent flooding, and allow irrigation of approximately 25,000 hectares (62,000 acres). As of February 2016, the Orango irrigation intake and canals have been built downstream of the dam for the use of Okenge and Owiro farmers in Migori County, but the construction of distributary channels has been delayed.

The Gogo Falls archaeological site is located near the dam.
