= Eburran industry =

13000 BCE East African tool assemblage

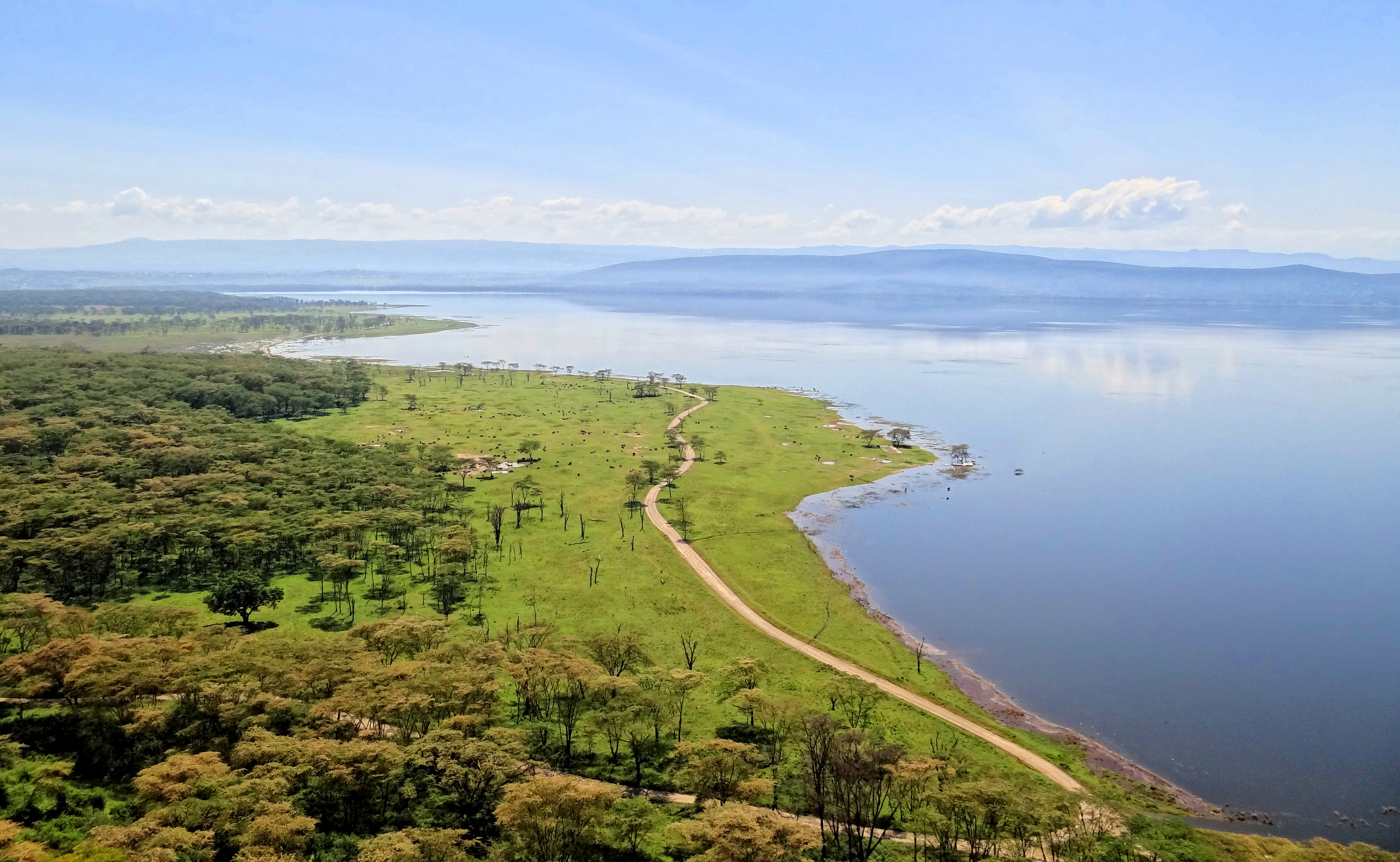
Lake Nakuru

The Eburran industry is the name of an East African tool assemblage that dates from 13,000 BCE and thereafter, found around Lake Nakuru in the Ol Doinyo Eburru volcano complex in the Rift Valley, Kenya.

The culture was at one time known as the "Kenyan Capsian" because findings resemble those of the North African Capsian trans-Saharan culture.

Eburran assemblages, as recovered from Gamble's Cave and Nderit Drift, comprise large backed blades, crescent microliths, burins, and endscrapers. Some tools at Gamble's Cave were made from obsidian.

== Phases ==
- Phase 1, from 13,000 BCE to around 10,000 BCE, associated with a short, humid climatic period, superseded by a drier climatic period
- Phase 2, from around 7-8,000 BCE, the climate became very humid
- Phase 3, from around 6,000 BCE
- Phase 4, from around 4-5,000 BCE, with an unevenly drier climate
- Phase 5, from around 3,000 BCE, the climate was much drier than now. During this last period, Eburran tools are also found with ceramics and livestock. It is part of the Pastoral Neolithic in Africa. Before phase 5, Eburran peoples lived by hunting, and gathering.
- Around 700 CE, a transformation from the Pastoral Neolithic to the Pastoral Iron Age took place.

== See also ==
- Enkapune Ya Muto
