= Diane Gifford-Gonzalez =

American archaeologist

Dr. Diane Gifford-Gonzalez
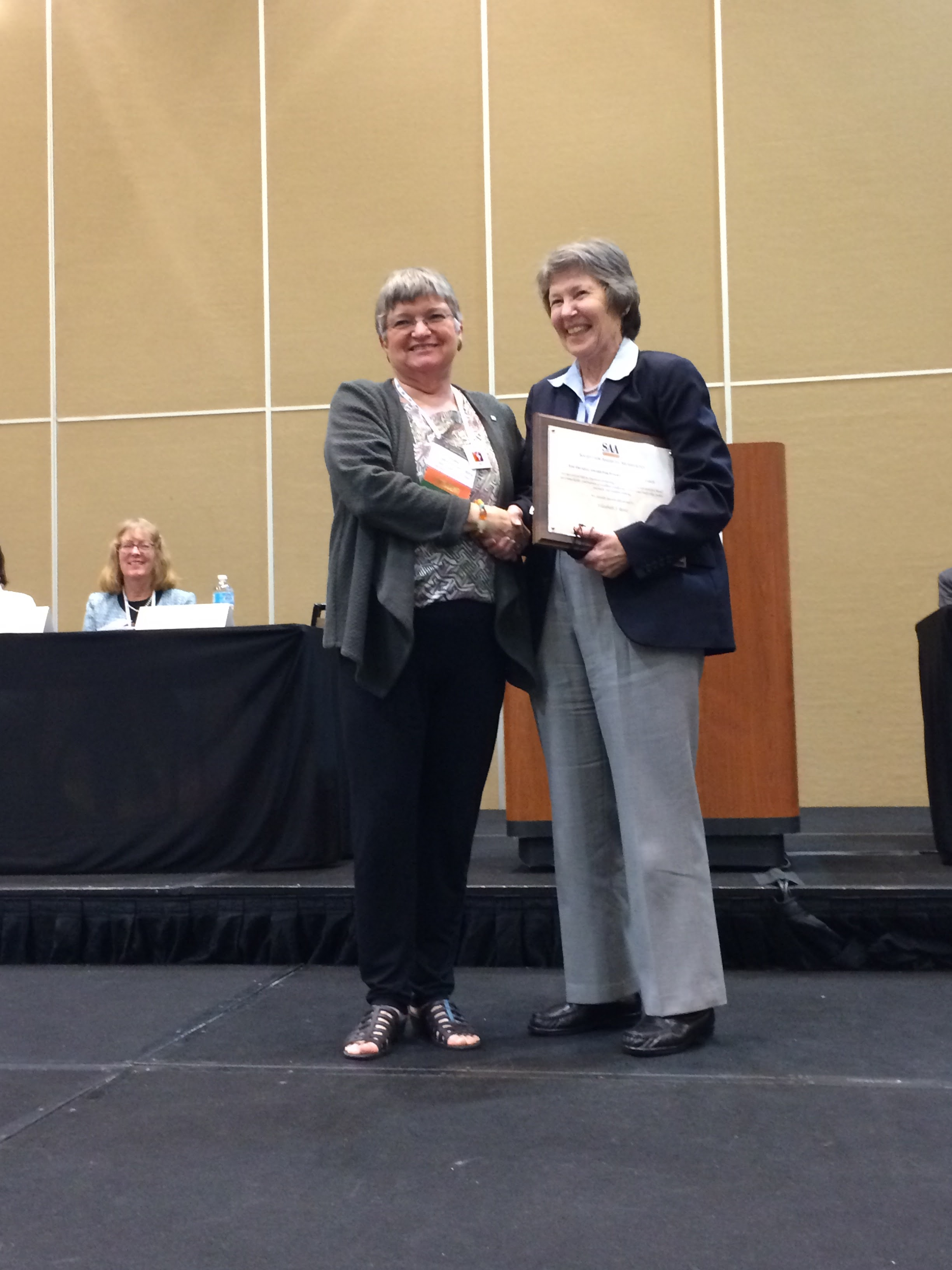
- SAA President Dr. Diane Gifford-Gonzalez (left) presenting the 2016 Society for American Archaeology's Fryxell Award to Dr. Elizabeth Reitz (right)
- Awards: 2014 Martin M. Chemers Award for Outstanding Research in the Division of Social Sciences, 2013 Committee of Honor International Conference of Archaeozoology (ICAZ), 2013 Presidential Recognition Award (SAA), 2007-2011 Fulbright Senior Specialist, 2003 Distinguished Teaching Award, and 1995 Presidential Recognition Award (SAA)

Academic background
- Education: University of California, Berkeley

Academic work
- Discipline: Anthropologist
- Sub-discipline: Zooarchaeology and African pastoralism
- Institutions: University of California Santa Cruz
- Website: http://anthro.ucsc.edu/faculty/singleton.php?&singleton=true&cruz_id=dianegg

Diane Gifford-Gonzalez is an American archaeologist who specializes in the field of zooarchaeology. Her research has included fieldwork near Lake Turkana, northwestern Kenya, and her research often touches on the question of animal domestication and the origins and development of African pastoralism. In 2024, Gifford-Gonzalez was elected to the National Academy of Sciences.

== Biography ==
Gifford-Gonzalez attended the University of California, Berkeley, where she received her B.A., M.A., and her Ph.D.

She has been the past President of both the Society for American Archaeology and the Society of Africanist Archaeologists, and has served on boards for the International Council of Archaeozoology (ICAZ), the Society for American Archaeology (SAA), and the Archaeology Division of the American Anthropological Association. She was also on the Academic Advisory Council of the Wenner-Gren Foundation for Anthropological Research and the Long-Range Planning Committee of the American Anthropological Association. In addition, she is on the editorial boards for the African Archaeological Review, Journal of African Archaeology, California Archaeology, and Teals d’Arqueologia.

She retired from teaching at the University of California, Santa Cruz at the end of the academic year in 2015. She has also taught at the University of Nairobi, the University of Tromsø, la Universidad del Centro de la Provincia de Buenos Aires, Argentina, and Academia Sinica, Beijing, China. In 2018, she published "An Introduction to Zooarchaeology" a 26-chapter textbook.

== Research ==
Gifford-Gonzalez's research at Lake Turkana on the border of Ethiopia and Kenya has put her at the forefront of scholars who study pastoralism in that area. She specializes in the study of the domestication of donkeys, cattle, sheep, and goats, and the importance that these animals had on the peoples who lived, and continue to live, at Lake Turkana. Cattle found at Pastoral Neolithic sites near Lake Turkana came with herders from northern Africa after the Sahara started to dry out. Gifford-Gonzalez argues that there seems to be a lag in the spread of domesticated animals farther south in eastern Africa, which may have been due to threats of livestock diseases such as Bovine Malignant Catarrhal Fever (MCF), which is almost 100% lethal for cattle. Other livestock diseases affect humans as well, such as Rift Valley Fever (RVF), East Coast Fever (ECF), foot-and-mouth disease (FMD), and trypanosomiasis (sleeping sickness). It is impossible, though, to tell if coming into contact with cattle caused epidemics of unfamiliar diseases in early pastoralist societies.

Gifford-Gonzalez has also studied early evidence for fishing around Lake Turkana. Fishing has typically been associated with anatomically modern humans, but evidence of fishing has been found at sites near Lake Rutanzige, Olduvai Gorge, and Lake Turkana that date from the late Pliocene to the Late Pleistocene, prior to the earliest known members of the genus Homo. Gifford-Gonzalez then asks if it may have been possible for early hominins to have fished, and to have passed that knowledge down to Homo sapiens. Gifford-Gonzalez and Kathlyn Stewart conducted ethnoarchaeological research with Dassanetch pastoralists who live in the lower Omo River Valley, and they found that the Dassanetch were relied entirely on their own livestock and on fish from the nearby river. Gifford-Gonzalez and Stewart were then able to study the material remains found at Dassanetch fishing camps, providing a useful point of reference for ancient archaeological finds from places such as Olduvai Gorge.

She has also written about the use of genetic data in the study of animal domestication. Genetic data show that cattle from South Asia, Africa, and Europe are related. It used to be thought that Africa had no unique domesticates of its own but some evidence tentatively points to an independent domestication process of cattle in Africa. Genetic studies of cattle show that African and European taurine's lineage diverged somewhere in the 22nd–26th millennia BP. Analyses point to domestication of European stock around 5000 BP and African stock being around 9000 BP, even if the date of domestication is a point of controversy. The domestication process is sometimes glossed over as an invention by humans and not a process that is biological and evolutionary. But Diane Gifford-Gonzalez argues that animal domestication is an ongoing, dynamic system of interaction with animals that causes lasting changes to that animal.

In 2023 Gifford-Gonzalez was awarded Fellow of the American Association for the Advancement of Science.
