= Louis Leakey =

British archaeologist and naturalist (1903–1972)

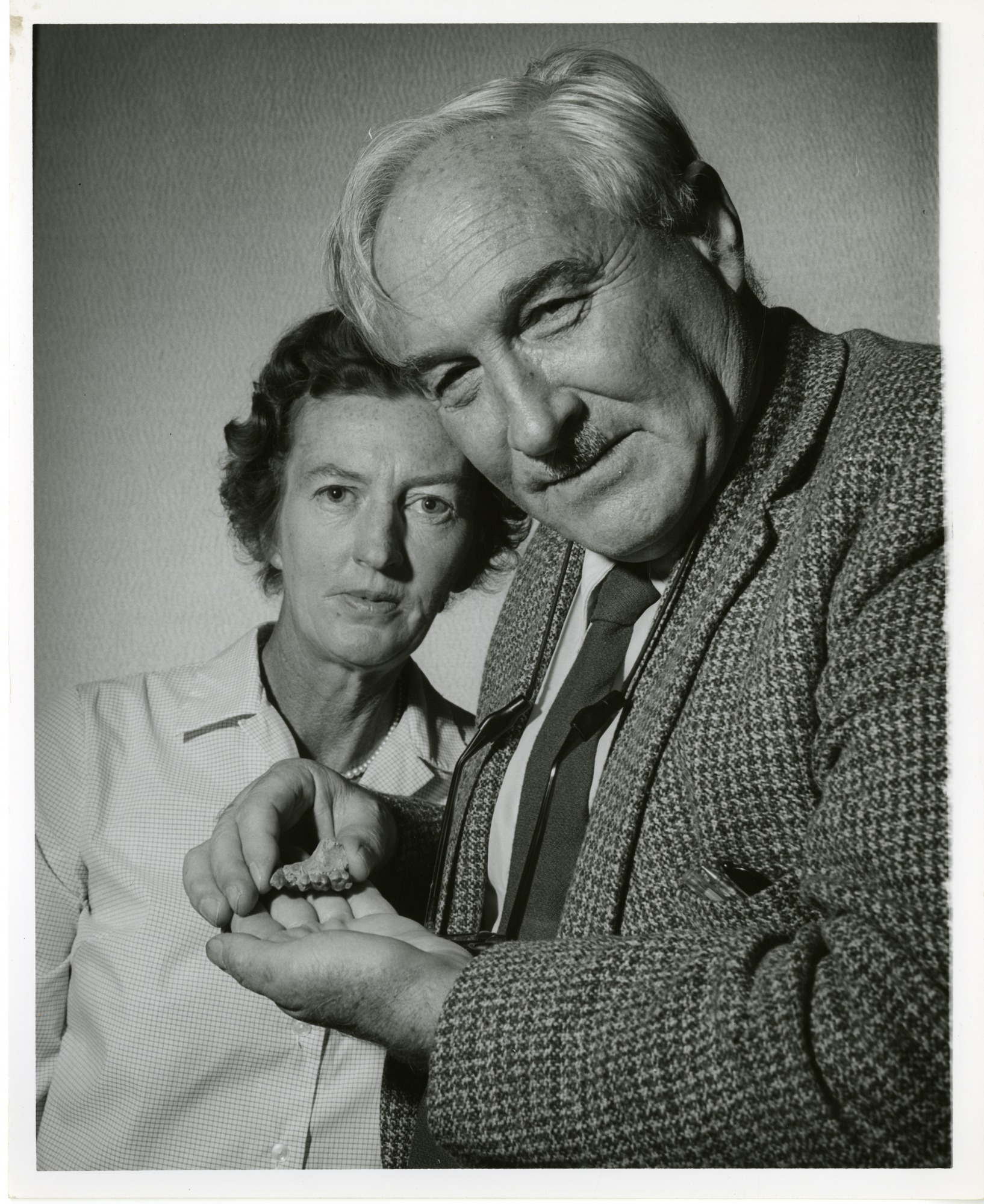
- Louis Leakey with his wife Mary in 1962
- Born: Louis Seymour Bazett Leakey; 7 August 1903; Kabete, East Africa Protectorate
- Died: 1 October 1972 (aged 69); London, England
- Education: St John's College, Cambridge (BA, PhD)
- Known for: Pioneering the study of human evolution in Africa
- Spouses: Frida Avern (m. 1928; div. 1936); Mary Leakey (m. 1936)
- Children: 5, including; Colin Leakey; Richard Leakey; Philip Leakey
- Awards: Hubbard Medal (1962); Royal Geographical Society's Founder's Medal (1968); Prestwich Medal (1969)
- Scientific career
- Fields: Archaeology, palaeoanthropology, palaeontology

Louis Seymour Bazett Leakey (7 August 1903 – 1 October 1972) was a Kenyan-British palaeoanthropologist and archaeologist whose work was important in demonstrating that humans evolved in Africa, particularly through discoveries made at Olduvai Gorge with his wife, fellow palaeoanthropologist Mary Leakey. Having established a programme of palaeoanthropological inquiry in eastern Africa, he also motivated many future generations to continue this scholarly work. Several members of the Leakey family became prominent scholars themselves.

Another of Leakey's legacies stems from his role in fostering field research of primates in their natural habitats, which he saw as key to understanding human evolution. He personally focused on three female researchers, Jane Goodall, Dian Fossey, and Birutė Galdikas, calling them "The Trimates." Each went on to become an important scholar in the field of primatology. Leakey also encouraged and supported many other PhD candidates, most notably from the University of Cambridge. As well, Leakey played a role in creating organisations for future research in Africa and for protecting wildlife there.

== Background ==
When I think back... of the serval cat and a baboon that I had as pets in my childhood days—and that eventually I had to house in large cages—it makes me sad. It makes me sadder still, however, and also very angry, when I think of the innumerable adult animals and birds deliberately caught and locked up for the so-called 'pleasure' and 'education' of thoughtless human beings.

— Louis Leakey, By the Evidence, Chapter 4

Leakey's parents, Harry (1868–1940) and Mary (May) Bazett Leakey (died 1948), were Church of England missionaries in British East Africa. Harry was the son of James Shirley Leakey (1824–1871), one of the eleven children of the portrait painter James Leakey. Harry Leakey was assigned to an established post of the Church Mission Society among the Kikuyu at Kabete, in the highlands north of Nairobi. The station was at that time a hut and two tents. Leakey's earliest home had an earthen floor, a leaky thatched roof, rodents and insects, and no heating system except for charcoal braziers. The facilities slowly improved over time. The mission, a centre of activity, set up a clinic in one of the tents, and later a girls' school. Harry was working on a translation of the Bible into the Gikuyu language. He had a distinguished career in the CMS, becoming canon of the station.

Leakey had a younger brother, Douglas, and two elder sisters, Gladys and Julia. Both sisters married missionaries: Gladys married Leonard Beecher, Anglican Bishop of Mombasa and then Archbishop of East Africa from 1960 to 1970; Julia married Lawrence Barham, the second Bishop of Rwanda and Burundi from 1964 to 1966; their son Ken Barham was later the Bishop of Cyangugu in Rwanda.

The Leakey household came to contain Miss Oakes (a governess), Miss Higgenbotham (another missionary), and Mariamu (a Kikuyu nurse). Leakey grew up, played, and learned to hunt with the native Kikuyus. He also learned to walk with the distinctive gait of the Kikuyu and speak their language fluently, as did his siblings. He was initiated into the Kikuyu ethnic group, an event of which he never spoke, as he was sworn to secrecy.

Leakey requested and was given permission to build and move into a Kikuyu-style hut at the end of the garden. It was home to his personal collection of natural objects, such as birds' eggs and skulls. All the children developed a keen interest in and appreciation of the pristine natural surroundings in which they found themselves. They raised baby animals, later turning them over to zoos. Leakey read a gift book, Days Before History, by H. R. Hall (1907), a juvenile fictional work illustrating the prehistory of Britain. He began to collect tools and was further encouraged in this activity by a role model, Arthur Loveridge, the first curator (1914) of the Natural History Museum in Nairobi, the predecessor of the Coryndon Museum. This interest may have predisposed him toward a career in archaeology. His father was also a role model: Canon Leakey co-founded East Africa and Uganda Natural History Society.

Neither Harry nor May was of strong constitution. From 1904 to 1906 the entire family lived back in England, at May's mother's house in Reading, Berkshire, while Harry recovered from neurasthenia, and again in 1911–1913, while May recovered from general frailty and exhaustion. During the latter stay, Harry bought a house in Boscombe, Hampshire.

== Formative years ==
=== Attendance at Cambridge ===
In Britain, the Leakey children attended primary school; in Africa, they had a tutor. The family spent World War I in Africa. When the sea lanes opened again in 1919, they returned to Boscombe, and Leakey was sent to Weymouth College, a private boys' school, when he was 16 years old. He did not do well and, in about three years, complained of bullying and rules that he considered an infringement on his freedom. Advised by one teacher to seek employment in a bank, he secured help from an English teacher in applying to St John's College, Cambridge. He received a scholarship for his high scores on the entrance exams.

Leakey thus matriculated at the University of Cambridge, his father's alma mater, in 1922, intending to become a missionary to British East Africa. The resourceful Leakey convinced Cambridge authorities to accept Kikuyu for a modern language requirement, which led to the tall tale that he had "examined himself" in the language.

=== Archaeological and palaeontological research ===
In 1922, the British had been awarded German East Africa as part of the settlement of World War I. Within the Tanganyika Territory the Germans had discovered a site rich in dinosaur fossils, Tendaguru. Leakey was told by C. W. Hobley, a friend of the family, that the British Museum of Natural History was going to send a fossil-hunting expedition led by William E. Cutler to the site. Leakey applied and was hired to locate the site and manage the administrative details. In 1924 they departed for Africa. They never found a complete dinosaur skeleton, and Leakey was recalled from the site by Cambridge in 1925.

Leakey switched his focus to anthropology, and found a new mentor in Alfred Cort Haddon, head of the Cambridge department. In 1926, Leakey graduated with a "double first", one of the highest degree results awarded, in archaeology and anthropology. He had used some of his preexisting qualifications; for example, Kikuyu was offered and accepted as the second modern language in which he was required to be proficient, even though no one there could test him on it. The university accepted an affidavit from a Kikuyu chief signed with a thumbprint.

From 1925 on Leakey lectured and wrote on African archaeological and palaeontological topics. On graduation he was such a respected figure that Cambridge sent him to East Africa to study prehistoric African humans. He excavated dozens of sites, undertaking for the first time a systematic study of the artefacts. Some of his names for archaeological cultures are still in use; for example, the Elmenteitan.

=== Research Fellow ===
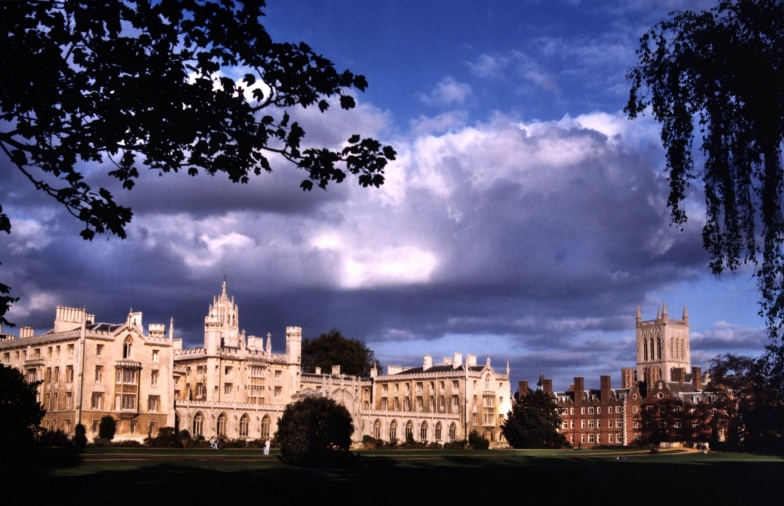
St. John's College, Cambridge.

In 1927, Leakey received a visit at a site called Gamble's Cave, near Lake Elmenteita, by two women on a holiday, one of whom was Frida Avern (1902–1993). Avern had done some coursework in archaeology. Leakey and Frida began a relationship, which continued upon his return to Cambridge. In 1928, they married and continued work near Lake Elmenteita. Finds from Gamble's Cave were donated by Leakey to the British Museum in 1931. At that time he discovered the Acheulean site of Kariandusi, which he excavated in 1928.

On the strength of his work there, he obtained a post-graduate research fellowship at St. John's College and returned to Cambridge in 1929 to classify and prepare the finds from Elmenteita. His patron and mentor at Cambridge was now Arthur Keith. While cleaning two skeletons he had found, he noticed a similarity to one found in Olduvai Gorge by Professor Hans Reck, a German national, whom Leakey had met in 1925 in Germany while on business for Keith.

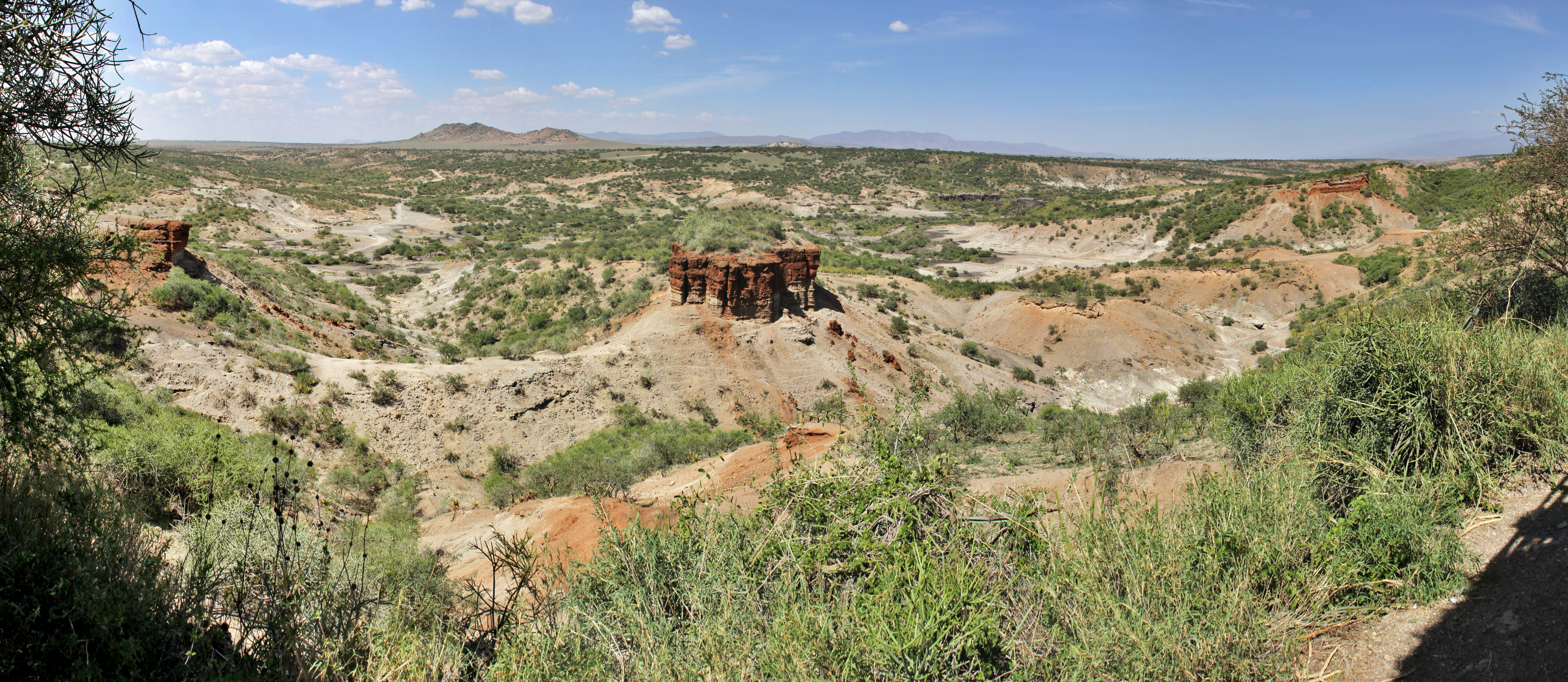
Olduvai Gorge in 2011.

The geology of Olduvai was known. In 1913, Reck had extricated a skeleton from Bed II in the gorge wall. He argued that it must have the date of the bed, which was believed to be 600,000 years, in the mid-Pleistocene. Early dates for human evolution were not widely accepted at the time, and Reck became involved in a media uproar. He was barred from going back to settle the question by the war and then the terms of the transfer of Tanganyika from Germany to Britain. In 1929, Leakey visited Berlin to talk to the now sceptical Reck. Noting an Acheulean tool in Reck's collection of artefacts from Olduvai, he bet Reck he could find ancient stone tools at Olduvai within 24 hours.

Leakey received his PhD degree in 1930 at the age of 27. His first child, a daughter named Priscilla Muthoni Leakey, was born in 1931. His headaches and epilepsy returned, and he was prescribed Luminal, which he took for the rest of his life.

== Reversals of fortune ==
=== Defence of Reck ===
In November 1931, Leakey led an expedition to Olduvai whose members included Reck, whom Leakey allowed to enter the gorge first. Leakey had bet Reck that Leakey would find Acheulean tools within the first 24 hours, which he did. These verified the provenance of the 1913 find, now called Olduvai Man. Non-humanoid fossils and tools were extracted from the ground in large numbers. Frida delayed joining her husband and was less enthusiastic about him on behalf of Priscilla. She did arrive eventually, however, and Leakey put her to work. Frida's site became FLK, for Frida Leakey's Karongo ("gully").

In Cambridge, the sceptics were not impressed. To find additional supporting evidence of the antiquity of Reck's Olduvai Man, Leakey returned to Africa, excavating at Kanam and Kanjera. He easily found more fossils, which he named Homo kanamensis (Now considered a synonym of Homo sapiens). While he was gone, the opposition worked up some "evidence" of the intrusion of Olduvai Man into an earlier layer, evidence that seemed convincing at the time, but is missing and unverifiable now. On his return, Leakey's finds were carefully examined by a committee of 26 scientists and were tentatively accepted as valid.

=== Scandal ===
Following their marriage in 1928, Leakey and Frida lived in Foxton near Cambridge. In November 1932, Frida used an inheritance to purchase a large brick-built house in Girton, which the family named "The Close".

The following year, Frida was pregnant, suffered from morning sickness most of the time, and was unable to work on the illustrations for Leakey's second book, Adam's Ancestors. At a dinner party given in his honour, after a lecture of his at the Royal Anthropological Institute, Gertrude Caton-Thompson introduced her own illustrator, the twenty-year-old Mary Nicol. Leakey convinced Mary to take on the illustration of his book, and a few months later companionship turned into an affair. Frida gave birth to Colin in December 1933, and the next month Leakey left her and his newborn son. She would not sue for divorce until 1936.

A panel at Cambridge investigated his morals. Grants dried up, but his mother raised enough money for another expedition to Olduvai, Kanam, and Kanjera, the last two on the Winam Gulf. His previous work there was questioned by P. G. H. Boswell, whom he invited to verify the sites for himself. Arriving at Kanam and Kanjera in 1935, they found that the iron markers Leakey had used to mark the sites had been removed by the Luo tribe for use as spears and the sites could not now be located. To make matters worse, all the photographs Leakey took were ruined by a light leak in the camera. After a frustrating and fruitless two-month search, Boswell left for England, promising, as Leakey understood it, not to publish a word until Leakey returned.

Boswell immediately set out to publish as much as he was able, beginning with a letter in Nature dated 9 March 1935, destroying Reck's and Leakey's dates of the fossils and questioning Leakey's competence. Despite the searches for the iron markers, Boswell averred that "the earlier expedition (of 1931–32) neither marked the localities on the ground nor recorded the sites on a map." In a field report of March 1935, Leakey accused Boswell of reneging on his word, but Boswell asserted he had made no such promise, and now having public opinion on his side, warned Leakey to withdraw the claim. Leakey was not only forced to retract the accusation in his final field report in June 1935 but also to recant his support of Reck. Leakey was finished at Cambridge: even his mentors turned on him.

=== On the road in Africa ===
Meeting Mary in Africa, he proceeded to Olduvai with a small party. Leakey's parents continued to urge him to return to Frida, and would pay for everyone in the party but Mary. Mary joined him under a stigma but her skill and competence eventually won over the other participants. Leakey and his associates did the groundwork for future excavation at Olduvai, uncovering dozens of sites for a broad sampling, as was his method. They were named after the excavator: SHK (Sam Howard's karongo), BK (Peter Bell's), SWK (Sam White's), MNK (Mary Nicol's). Leakey and Mary conducted a temporary clinic for the Maasai, made preliminary investigations of Laetoli, and ended by studying the rock paintings at the Kisese/Cheke region.

=== Return to England ===
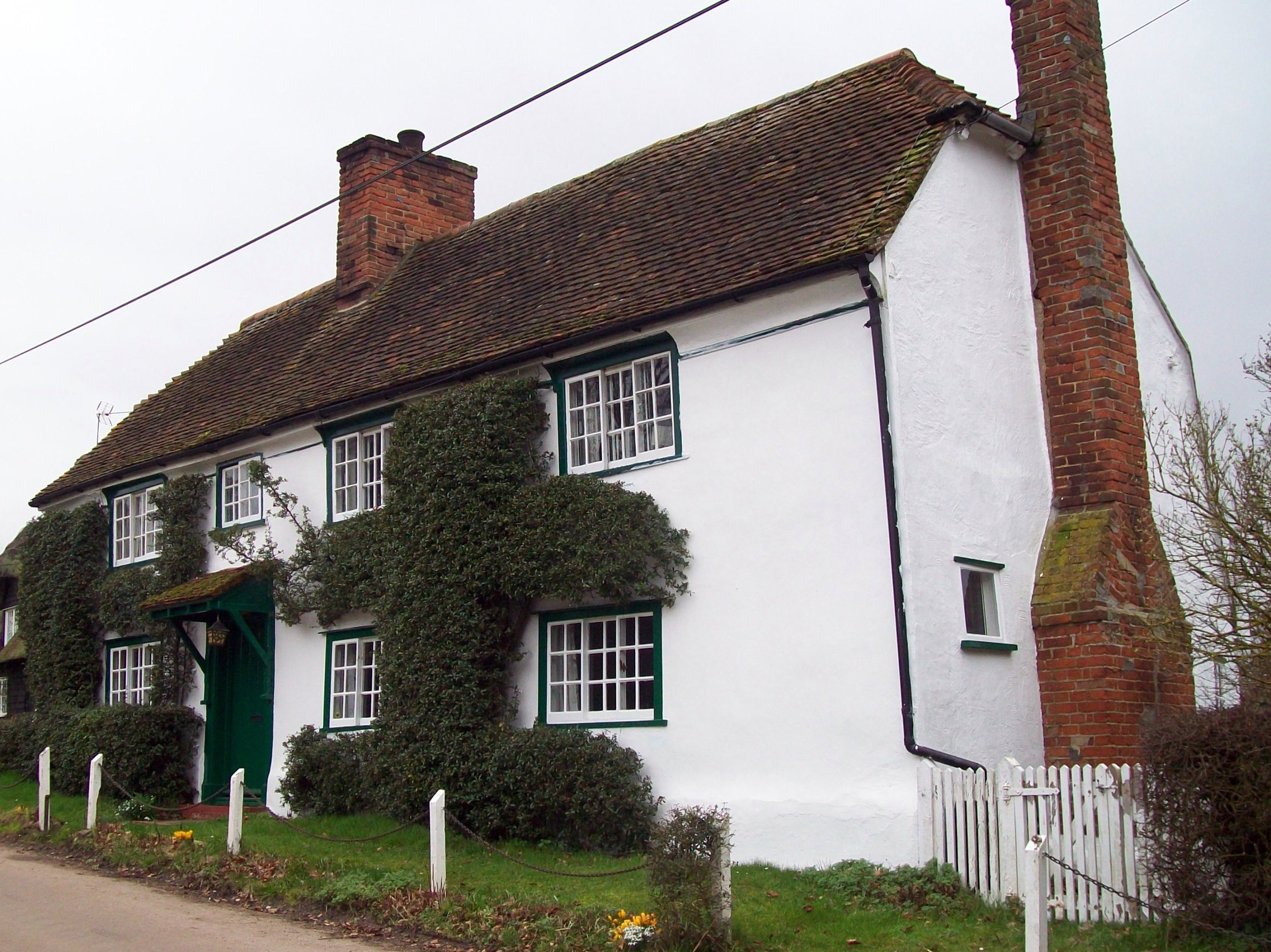
Steen Cottage, Nasty, Great Munden in 2011

Leakey and Mary returned to England in 1935 without positions or any place to stay except Mary's mother's apartment. They soon leased Steen Cottage in the hamlet of Nasty in the parish of Great Munden. The couple lived without heating, electricity, or plumbing, fetching water from a well and writing by oil lantern. They lived in poverty for 18 months at this low point of their fortunes, visited at first only by Mary's relatives. Leakey gardened for subsistence and exercise and improved the house and grounds. He appealed at last to the Royal Society, who relented with a small grant to continue work on his collection.

== In British East Africa ==
=== Return to British East Africa ===
Leakey had already involved himself in Kikuyu tribal affairs in 1928, taking a stand against female genital cutting. He got into a shouting match in Kikuyu one evening with Jomo Kenyatta, later the president of Kenya, who was lecturing on the topic. R. Copeland at Oxford recommended he apply to the Rhodes Trust for a grant to write a study of the Kikuyu and it was given late in 1936 along with a salary for two years. In January 1937 the Leakeys travelled to Kenya. Colin would not see his father for 20 years.

Leakey returned to Kiambaa near Nairobi and persuaded Senior Chief Koinange, who designated a committee of chiefs to help him describe the Kikuyu the way they had been. Mary excavated at Waterfall Cave. She fell ill with double pneumonia and was near death for two weeks in the hospital in Nairobi, during which time her mother was sent for. Contrary to expectation, she recovered and began another excavation at Hyrax Hill and then Njoro River Cave. Leakey got an extension of his grant, which he used partially for fossil-hunting. Leakey's discoveries began to appear in the newspapers again.

Tensions between the Kikuyu and the settlers increased alarmingly. Leakey jumped into the fray as an exponent of the middle ground. In Kenya: Contrasts and Problems, he angered the settlers by proclaiming Kenya could never be a "white man's country."

=== Fossil police ===
The government offered Leakey work as a policeman in intelligence, which he accepted. He travelled the country as a pedlar, reporting on the talk. In September 1939, when Britain went to war, the Kenyan government drafted Leakey into its African intelligence service. Apart from some bumbling around, during which he and some settlers stalked each other as possible saboteurs of the Sagana Railway Bridge, his first task was to supply and arm Ethiopian guerrillas against the Italian invaders of their country. He created a clandestine network using his childhood friends among the Kikuyu. They also hunted fossils on the sly.

Leakey conducted interrogations, analysed handwriting, wrote radio broadcasts and took on regular police investigations. He loved a good mystery of any sort. The white leadership of the King's African Rifles used him extensively to clear up many cultural mysteries; for example, he helped an officer remove a curse he had inadvertently put on his men.

Mary continued to find and excavate sites. In 1940, their son Jonathan Leakey was born. Mary worked in the Coryndon Memorial Museum (later called the National Museums of Kenya) where Leakey joined her as an unpaid honorary curator in 1941. Their life was a melange of police work and archaeology. They investigated Rusinga Island and Olorgesailie. At the latter site they were assisted by a team of Italian experts recruited from the prisoners of war and paroled for the purpose.

In 1942, the Italian menace ended, but the Japanese began to reconnoitre with a view toward landing in force. Leakey found himself in counter-intelligence work, which he performed with zest and imagination. In the same year, their daughter Deborah was born, but died at the age of three months. They lived in a rundown and bug-infested Nairobi home, provided by the museum. Jonathan was attacked by army ants in his crib.

=== Turn of the tide ===
In 1944 Richard Leakey was born. In 1945 the family's income from police work all but vanished. By now Leakey was getting plenty of job offers but he chose to stay on in Kenya as Curator of the Coryndon Museum, with an annual salary and a house, but more importantly, to continue palaeoanthropological research.

In January 1947 Leakey conducted the first Pan-African Congress of Prehistory at Nairobi. Sixty scientists from 26 countries attended, delivering papers and visiting the Leakey sites. The conference restored Leakey to the scientific fold and made him a major figure in it. With the money that now poured in Leakey undertook the famous expeditions of 1948 and beyond at Rusinga Island in Lake Victoria, where Mary discovered the most complete Proconsul fossil up to that time.

Charles Watson Boise donated money for a boat to be used for transport on Lake Victoria, The Miocene Lady. Its skipper, Hassan Salimu, was later to deliver Jane Goodall to Gombe. Philip Leakey was born in 1949. In 1950, Leakey was awarded an honorary doctorate by Oxford University.

=== Kenyan affairs ===
... I sought a personal interview with the governor, hoping to make him appreciate that it was no longer possible to continue along the lines of the old colonial regime. ... Colonial governors and senior civil servants are not easy people to argue with; and, of course, I was not popular, because of my criticism of the colonial service ... Had it been possible to make the government open its eyes to the realities of the situation, I believe that the whole miserable episode of what is frequently spoken of as 'the Mau Mau rebellion' need never have taken place.

— By the Evidence, Chapter 18

While the Leakeys were at Lake Victoria, the Kikuyu struck at the European settlers of the Kenyan highlands, who seemed to have the upper hand and were insisting on a "white" government of a "white" Africa. In 1949 the Kikuyu formed a secret society, the Mau Mau, which attacked settlers and especially loyalist Kikuyu.

Leakey had attempted to warn Sir Philip Mitchell, governor of the colony, that nocturnal meetings and forced oaths were not Kikuyu customs and foreboded violence, but was ignored. Now he found himself pulled away from anthropology to investigate the Mau Mau. During this period his life was threatened and a reward placed on his head. The Leakeys began to carry pistols, termed "European National Dress." The government placed him under 24-hour guard.

In 1952, after a Mau Mau massacre of pro-British chiefs, the government arrested Jomo Kenyatta, president of the Kenya African Union. Leakey was summoned to be a court interpreter, but withdrew after an accusation of mistranslation because of prejudice against the defendant. He returned on request to translate documents only. Because of lack of evidence linking Kenyatta to the Mau Mau, although convicted, he did not receive the death penalty, but was sentenced to several years of hard labour.

The government brought in British troops and formed a home guard of 20,000 Kikuyu. During this time, Leakey played a difficult and contradictory role. He sided with the settlers, serving as their spokesman and intelligence officer, helping to ferret out bands of guerrillas. On the other hand, he continued to advocate for the Kikuyu in his 1954 book Defeating Mau Mau and numerous talks and articles. He recommended a multi-racial government, land reform in the highlands, a wage hike for the Kikuyu, and many other reforms, most of which were eventually adopted.

The government then realised the rebellion was being directed from urban centres, instituted martial law and detained the committees. Following Leakey's suggestion, thousands of Kikuyu were placed in re-education camps and resettled in new villages. The rebellion continued from bases under Mount Kenya until 1956, when, deprived of its leadership and supplies, it had to disperse. The state of emergency lasted until 1960. In 1963 Kenya became independent, with Jomo Kenyatta as prime minister.

== Work in palaeoanthropology ==
=== Olduvai Gorge ===
We know from the study of evolution that, again and again, various branches of animal stock have become over-specialized, and that over-specialization has led to their extinction. Present-day Homo sapiens is in many physical respects still very unspecialized ... But in one thing man, as we know him today, is over-specialized. His brain power is very over-specialized compared to the rest of his physical make-up, and it may well be that this over-specialization will lead, just as surely, to his extinction. ... if we are to control our future, we must first understand the past better.

— Adam's Ancestors, 4th ed., final page

Beginning in 1951, Leakey and Mary began intensive research at Olduvai Gorge. A trial trench in Bed II at BK in 1951 was followed by a more extensive excavation in 1952. They found what Leakey termed an Oldowan "slaughter-house", an ancient bog where animals had been trapped and butchered. Excavations stopped in 1953 but were briefly resumed in 1955 with Jean Brown.

In 1959, excavations at Bed I were opened. While Leakey was sick in camp, Mary discovered the fossilized skull OH 5 at FLK, Paranthropus boisei, famously identified as "Zinjanthropus" or "Zinj." The question was whether the fossil belonged to a previous genus discovered by Robert Broom, Paranthropus, or a member of a different genus ancestral to humans. Leakey opted for Zinjanthropus, a decision opposed by Wilfrid Le Gros Clark, but one which attracted the attention of Melville Bell Grosvenor, president of the National Geographic Society. That contact resulted in an article in National Geographic and a large grant to continue work at Olduvai.

In 1960, geophysicists Jack Evernden and Garniss Curtis dated Bed I from 1.89 to 1.75 million years ago, confirming the great antiquity of fossil hominids in Africa.

In 1960, Leakey appointed Mary director of excavation at Olduvai. She brought in a staff of Kamba assistants, including Kamoya Kimeu, who later discovered many of eastern Africa's most famous fossils. At Olduvai, Mary set up Camp 5 and began work with her own staff and associates.

At "Jonny's site", FLK-NN, Jonathan Leakey discovered two skull fragments without the Australopithecine sagittal crest, which Mary connected with Broom's and Robinson's Telanthropus. The problem with it was its contemporaneity with Zinjanthropus. When mailed photographs, Le Gros Clark retorted casually "Shades of Piltdown." Leakey cabled him immediately and had some strong words at this suggestion that it might be a forgery. Clark apologised.

Not long afterwards, in 1960, Leakey, his son Philip and Ray Pickering discovered a fossil Leakey termed "Chellean Man", (Olduvai Hominid 9), in a context with Oldowan tools. After reconstruction Leakey and Mary called it "Pinhead." It was subsequently identified as Homo erectus, contemporaneous with Paranthropus at 1.4 million years old.

In 1961 Leakey got a salary as well as a grant from the National Geographic Society and turned over the acting directorship of Coryndon to a subordinate. He created the Centre for Prehistory and Palaeontology on the same grounds, moved his collections to it, and appointed himself director. This was his new operations centre. He opened another excavation at Fort Ternan on Lake Victoria. Shortly after, Heselon discovered Kenyapithecus wickeri, named after the owner of the property. Leakey promptly celebrated with George Gaylord Simpson, who happened to be present, aboard the Miocene Lady with "Leakey Safari Specials", a drink made of condensed milk and cognac.

In 1962 Leakey was visiting Olduvai when Ndibo Mbuika discovered the first tooth of Homo habilis at MNK. Leakey and Mary thought it was female and named her Cinderella, or Cindy. Phillip Tobias identified Jonny's Child with it and Raymond Dart came up with the name Homo habilis at Leakey's request, which Tobias translated as "handyman." It was seen as intermediary between gracile Australopithecus and Homo.

=== Calico Hills ===
In 1959 Leakey, while at the British Museum of Natural History in London, received a visit from Ruth DeEtte Simpson, an archaeologist from California. Simpson had acquired what looked like ancient scrapers from a site in the Calico Hills and showed it to Leakey.

In 1963, Leakey obtained funds from the National Geographic Society and commenced archaeological excavations with Simpson. Excavations at the site carried out by Leakey and Simpson revealed that they had located stone artefacts which were dated 100,000 years or older, suggesting a human presence in North America much earlier than others had estimated.

The geologist Vance Haynes had made three visits to the site in 1973 and had claimed that the artefacts found by Leakey were naturally formed geofacts. According to Haynes, the geofacts were formed by stones becoming fractured in an ancient river on the site.

In her autobiography, Mary Leakey wrote that because of Leakey's involvement with the Calico Hills site she had lost academic respect for him and that the Calico excavation project was "catastrophic to his professional career and was largely responsible for the parting of our ways".

== The Trimates ==
One of Leakey's legacies stems from his role in fostering field research of primates in their natural habitats, which he understood as key to unravelling the mysteries of human evolution. He personally chose three female researchers, Jane Goodall, Dian Fossey, and Biruté Galdikas, calling them The Trimates. Each went on to become an important scholar in the field of primatology, immersing themselves in the study of chimpanzees, gorillas and orangutans, respectively. Leakey also encouraged and supported many other PhD candidates, most notably from Cambridge University. Leakey believed that women were better at studying primates than men, as shown in the book Primates.

== Last years ==
During his final years Leakey became famous as a lecturer in the United Kingdom and United States. He did not excavate any longer, as he was impaired by arthritis, for which he had a hip replacement in 1968. He raised funds and directed his family and associates. In Kenya he was a facilitator for hundreds of scientists exploring the East African Rift system for fossils.

In 1968, Leakey refused an honorary doctorate from the University of Witwatersrand in Johannesburg, primarily because of apartheid in South Africa. Mary accepted one, and they thereafter led separate professional lives.

In the last few years Leakey's health began to fail more seriously. He had his first heart attacks and spent six months in the hospital. An empathy over health brought him and Dian Fossey together for a brief romance, which she broke off. Richard began to assume more and more of his father's responsibilities, which Leakey resisted, but in the end was forced to accept.

== Death and legacy ==
On 1 October 1972, Leakey had a heart attack in the London apartment of Vanne Goodall (Jane Goodall's mother). Vanne sat up all night with him in St. Stephen's Hospital and left at 9:00 a.m. He died 30 minutes later at the age of 69.

Mary wanted to cremate Leakey and fly the ashes back to Nairobi. Richard objected, and Leakey's body was flown home and interred at Limuru, near the graves of his parents.

In denial, the family did not face the question of a memorial marker for a year. When Richard went to place a stone on the grave he found one already there, courtesy of Leakey's former secretary Rosalie Osborn. The inscription was signed with the letters, ILYUA, "I'll love you always", which Rosalie used to place on her letters to him. Richard left it in place.

=== Prominent organisations ===
- In 1947, Leakey was central to the organisation of the first PanAfrican Archaeological Association congress, held in Nairobi. From 1955 to 1959 he was its president.
- In 1958, Leakey founded the Tigoni Primate Research Centre with Cynthia Booth, on her farm north of Nairobi. Later it was the National Primate Research Centre, currently the Institute of Primate Research, now in Nairobi. As the Tigoni centre, it funded Leakey's Angels.
- In 1961, Leakey created the Centre for Prehistory and Palaeontology on the same grounds as Coryndon Museum, appointing himself director.
- In 1968, Leakey assisted with the founding of The Leakey Foundation to ensure the legacy of his life's work in the study of human origins.

=== Prominent family members ===
Louis Leakey was married to Mary Leakey, who made the noteworthy discovery of fossil footprints at Laetoli, Tanzania. Found preserved in volcanic ash, they are the earliest record of bipedal gait.

Leakey is also the father of palaeoanthropologist Richard Leakey and the botanist Colin Leakey. Leakey's cousin, Nigel Gray Leakey, was a recipient of the Victoria Cross during World War II.

Leakey family tree

James Leakey (1775–1865) (Note: O'Donoghue, F. M.; Remington, V. (revised) (2004). "Leakey, James (1775–1865), miniature painter". Oxford Dictionary of National Biography (online ed.). Oxford University Press. doi:10.1093/ref:odnb/16244. (Subscription, Wikipedia Library access or UK public library membership required.)) | Eliza Hubbard Woolmer (1793–1855)
James Shirley Leakey (1824–1871) | Caroline Woolmer Leakey (1827–1881) | 8 others | Peter Nettleton Leakey (1830–1906)
Rev. Arundell Leakey (1853–1924) | Rev. Harry Leakey (1868–1940) | Alexander Bazett Leakey (1879–1961)
Elizabeth Laing (1873–1925) | Arundell Gray Leakey (1885–1954) | 4 others | Raymond Arundell Leakey (1887–1976) | Henrietta Wilfrida Avern (1902–1993) | Louis Seymour Bazett Leakey (1903–1972) | Mary Douglas Nicol (1913–1996) | 3 others | Phil Leakey (1908–1992) | Alexander Graham Leakey (1911–1994)
Nigel Gray Leakey (1913–1941) | Robert Dove Leakey (1914–2013) | Maj. Gen. Arundell Rea Leakey (1915–1999) | Agnes Florence Leakey (1917–2006) | Ian Raymond Arundell Leakey (1924–2020) | Colin Louis Avern Leakey (1933–2018) | Meave Epps (b. 1942) | Richard Erskine Frere Leakey (1944–2022) | Margaret Cropper | Jonathan Harry Erskine Leakey (1940–2021) | Philip Leakey (b. 1949) | Mary Anne Leakey
Lt. Gen. Arundell David Leakey (b. 1952) | Mark Leakey (b. 1956) | Tamsin Leakey | Charles Bird (b. 1954) | Louise Leakey (b. 1972) | Emmanuel, Prince de Mérode (b. 1970) | Olivia Colman (b. 1974)
Joshua Leakey (b. 1988) | Lara Bird (b. 1998)

== Books ==
Leakey's books are listed below. The gaps between books are filled by too many articles to list. It was Leakey who began the Leakey family tradition of publishing in Nature.

| First publication date | Title | Notes |
|---|---|---|
| 1931 | The Stone Age Culture of Kenya Colony | Written in 1929. Illustrated by Frida Leakey. |
| 1934 | Adam's Ancestors: The Evolution of Man and His Culture | Multiple editions with rewrites, the 4th in 1955. Illustrated by Mary Leakey. Book reviews: |
| 1935 | The Stone Age races of Kenya | Proposes Homo kanamensis. |
| 1936 | Kenya: Contrasts and Problems | Written in 1935. |
| 1936 | Stone Age Africa: an Outline of Prehistory in Africa | Ten chapters consisting of the ten Munro Lectures delivered in 1936 by Leakey to Edinburgh University and intended by him as a textbook. Illustrated by Mary Leakey. |
| 1937 | White African: an Early Autobiography | Leakey described it as a "pot-boiler" written in 1936 for Hodder & Stoughton. |
| 1951 | The Miocene Hominoidea of East Africa | With Wilfrid Le Gros Clark. Volume I of the series Fossil Mammals of Africa published by the Natural History Museum in London. |
| 1951 | Olduvai Gorge: A Report on the Evolution of the Hand-Axe Culture in Beds I–IV | Started in 1935. Names the Olduwan Culture. |
| 1952 | Mau Mau and the Kikuyu | Online at |
| 1953 | Animals in Africa | Photographs by Ylla. |
| 1954 | Defeating Mau Mau | With Peter Schmidt. Online at |
| 1965 | Olduvai Gorge: A Preliminary Report on the Geology and Fauna, 1951–61 | Volume 1. |
| 1969 | Unveiling Man's Origins | With Vanne Morris Goodall. |
| 1969 | Animals of East Africa: The Wild realm | |
| 1970 | Olduvai Gorge, 1965–1967 | |
| 1974 | By the Evidence: Memoirs, 1932–1951 | Written in 1972 and published posthumously. Leakey finished writing on the day before his death. |
| 1977 | The Southern Kikuyu before 1903 | Published posthumously. The manuscript remained in Leakey's safe for decades for lack of a publisher. It was 3 volumes. He refused to follow editorial advice and shorten it. |

== See also ==
- Calico Early Man Site – Archaeological site in California, United States
- Campaign against female genital mutilation in colonial Kenya – Period in Kenyan history (1929–1932)
- Leakey family – British-Kenyan influential family
- List of fossil sites (with link directory)
- List of hominina (hominid) fossils (with images)
- Nigel Leakey – Leakey's cousin

== Bibliography ==
- Virginia Morell, Ancestral Passions: The Leakey Family and the Quest for Humankind's Beginnings, 1995.
- Mary Bowman-Kruhm, The Leakeys: a Biography, Greenwood Press, 2005. ISBN 0-313-32985-0
- Roger Lewin, "The Old Man of Olduvai Gorge", Smithsonian Magazine, October 2002.
