= Mau Escarpment =

Geological feature in Kenya

- Location within Kenya

Highest point
- Elevation: 3,000 m (9,800 ft)
- Coordinates: 0°38′36″S 36°03′42″E

Geography
- Location: Kenya

The Mau Escarpment is a fault scarp running along the western edge of the Great Rift Valley in Kenya. The top of the escarpment reaches approximately 3,000 m (10,000 ft) above sea level, and is over 1,000 m higher than the floor of the Rift Valley.

== British Uganda Scheme ==
The Uganda Scheme was a plan to give a portion of the East Africa Protectorate to the Jewish people as a homeland. The offer was first made by British Colonial Secretary Joseph Chamberlain first offered 13,000 km^{2} of the Mau Escarpment to Theodore Herzl's Zionist group in 1903. The offer was a response to pogroms in the Russian Empire, and it was hoped the area could be a refuge from persecution for the Jewish people.

The idea was brought to the World Zionist Organization's Sixth Zionist Congress in 1903 in Basel. There, a fierce debate ensued. The African land was described as an "ante-chamber to the Holy Land", but other groups felt that accepting the offer would make it more difficult to establish a Jewish state in Palestine in Ottoman Syria, particularly the Mutasarrifate of Jerusalem. Before the vote on the matter, the Russian delegation stormed out in opposition. In the end, the motion to consider the plan passed by 295 to 177 votes.

The next year, a three-man delegation was sent to inspect the plateau. Its high elevation gave it a temperate climate, making it suitable for European settlement. However, observers found a dangerous land filled with lions and other creatures. Moreover, it was populated by a large number of Maasai people, who did not seem at all amenable to an influx of people coming from Europe.

After receiving this report, Congress decided in 1905 to politely decline the British offer. Some Jews, who viewed this as a mistake, formed the Jewish Territorial Organization with the aim of establishing a Jewish state anywhere.

== See also ==
- Enkapune Ya Muto
