= Peninj =

National Historic Site of Tanzania

Peninj Site
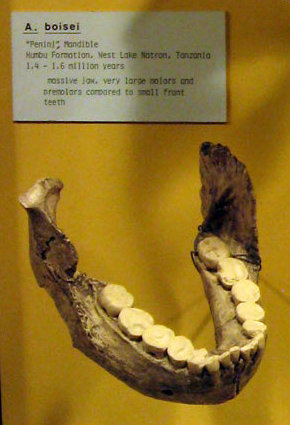
- Peninj Mandible that was discovered at Peninj Site

- Site location in Tanzania
- 2°19′59.99″S 35°58′0″E
- Type: Settlement
- Location: Ngorongoro District, Arusha Region, Tanzania
- Region: Eastern Africa

Site notes
- Excavation dates: 1964
- Archaeologists: Kamoya Kimeu, Glynn Isaac & Richard Leakey
- Condition: Excavated
- Owner: Tanzanian Government
- Management: Antiquities Division, Ministry of Natural Resources and Tourism
- Public access: Yes

National Historic Sites of Tanzania
- Official name: Peninj Site
- Type: Cultural

Peninj is a pre-historic site located in Pinyinyi ward of Ngorongoro District in Arusha Region, Tanzania. This the site where the Peninj Mandible was discovered in 1964.
