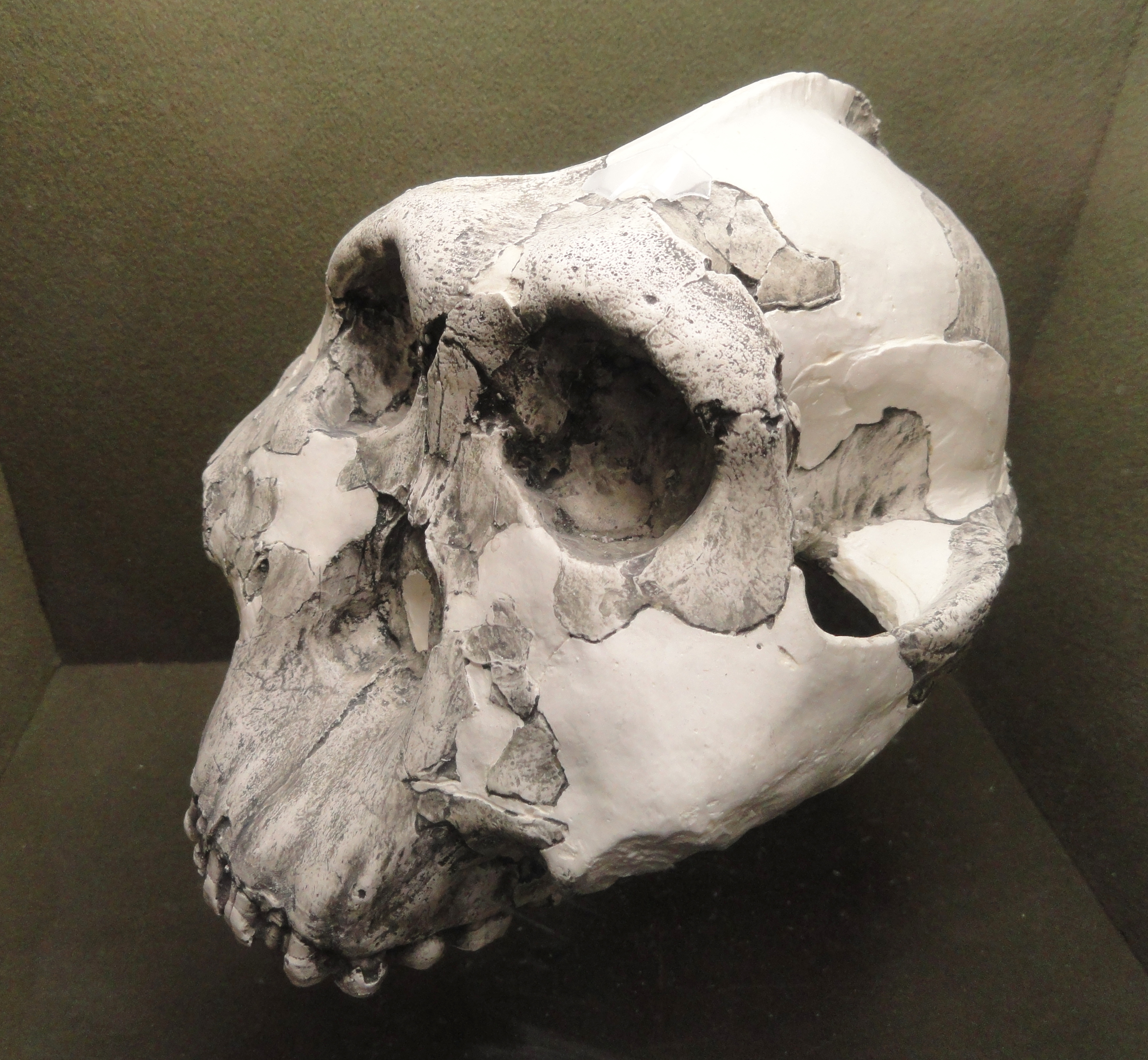
- Reconstruction of the holotype specimen OH 5

Scientific classification
- Kingdom: Animalia
- Phylum: Chordata
- Class: Mammalia
- Order: Primates
- Superfamily: Hominoidea
- Family: Hominidae
- Genus: †Paranthropus
- Species: †P. boisei

Binomial name
- †Paranthropus boisei (Louis Leakey, 1959)

Synonyms
- Zinjanthropus boisei; Australopithecus boisei; P. aethiopicus?

= Paranthropus boisei =

Paranthropus boisei Temporal range: 2.5–1.15 Ma Early Pleistocene

Extinct species of hominin of East Africa

Paranthropus boisei is a species of australopithecine from the Early Pleistocene of East Africa about 2.5 to 1.15 million years ago. The holotype specimen, OH 5, was discovered by palaeoanthropologist Mary Leakey in 1959 at Olduvai Gorge, Tanzania and described by her husband Louis a month later. It was originally placed into its own genus as "Zinjanthropus boisei", but is now relegated to Paranthropus along with other robust australopithecines. However, it is also argued that Paranthropus is an invalid grouping and synonymous with Australopithecus, so the species is also often classified as Australopithecus boisei.

Robust australopithecines are characterised by heavily built skulls capable of producing high stresses and bite forces, and some of the largest molars with the thickest enamel of any known ape. P. boisei is the most robust of this group. Brain size was about 450–550 cc (27–34 cu in), similar to other australopithecines. Some skulls are markedly smaller than others, which is taken as evidence of sexual dimorphism where females are much smaller than males, though body size is difficult to estimate given only one specimen, OH 80, definitely provides any bodily elements. The presumed male OH 80 may have been 156 cm (5 ft 1 in) tall and 61.7 kg (136 lb) in weight, and the presumed female KNM-ER 1500 124 cm (4 ft 1 in) tall (though its species designation is unclear). The arm and hand bones of OH 80 and KNM-ER 47000 suggest P. boisei was arboreal to a degree.

P. boisei was originally believed to have been a specialist species of hard foods, such as nuts, due to its heavily built skull, but it was more likely a generalist feeder of predominantly abrasive C4 plants, such as grasses or underground storage organs. Like gorillas, the apparently specialised adaptations of the skull may have only been used with less desirable fallback foods, allowing P. boisei to inhabit a wider range of habitats than gracile australopithecines. P. boisei may have been able to make Oldowan stone tools and butcher carcasses. P. boisei mainly inhabited wet, wooded environments, and coexisted with H. habilis, H. rudolfensis and H. ergaster/erectus. These were likely preyed upon by the large carnivores of the time, including big cats, crocodiles, and hyenas.

== Research history ==
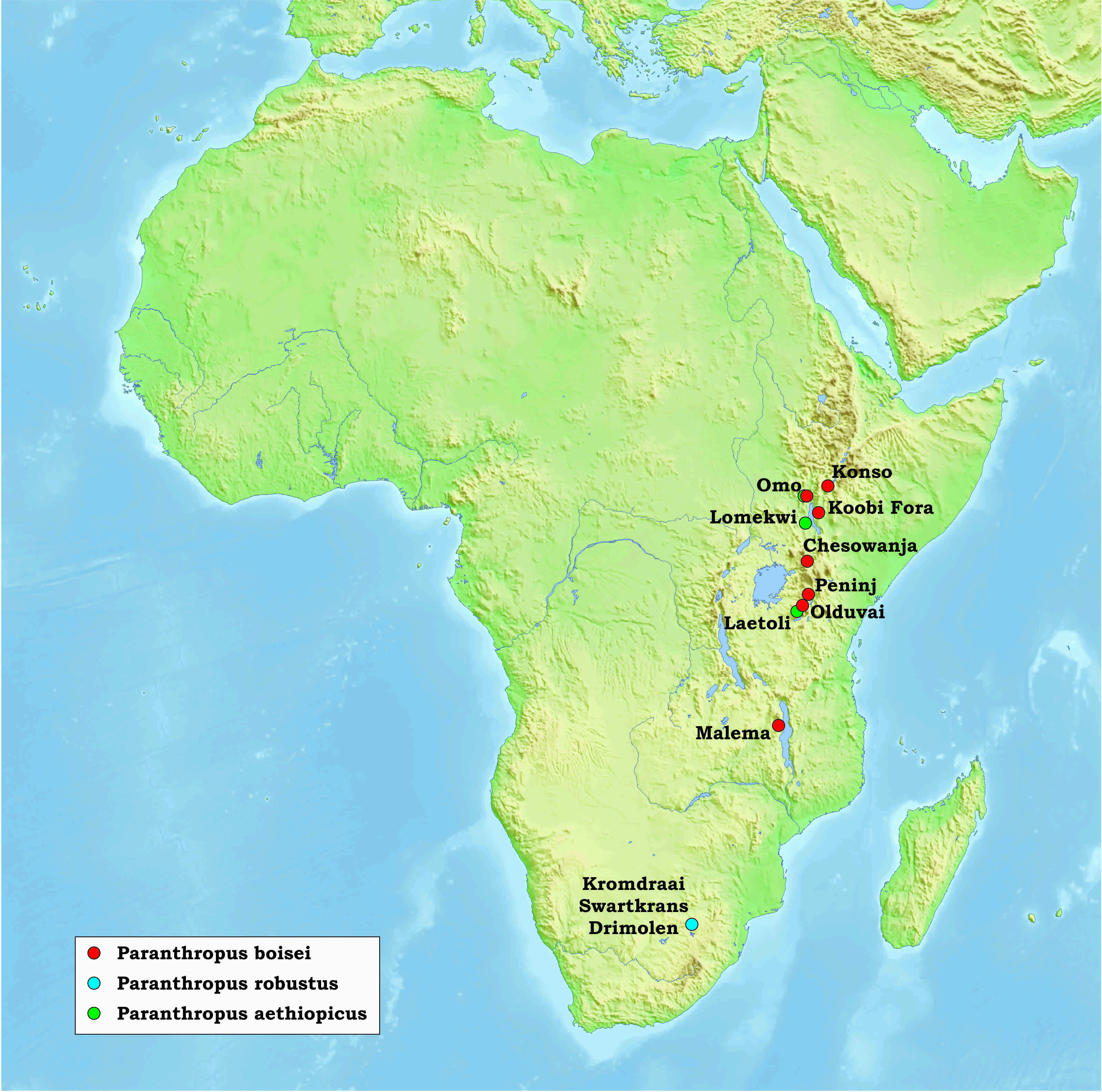
Map of Paranthropus finds (P. boisei in red)

=== Discovery ===
Palaeoanthropologists Mary and Louis Leakey had conducted excavations in Tanzania since the 1930s, though work was postponed with the start of World War II. They returned in 1951, finding mostly ancient tools and fossils of extinct mammals for the next few years. In 1955, they unearthed a hominin baby canine and large molar tooth in Olduvai Gorge, catalogue ID Olduvai Hominin (OH) 3.

On the morning of July 17, 1959, Louis felt ill and stayed at camp while Mary went out to Bed I's Frida Leakey Gully. Sometime around 11:00 a.m., she noticed what appeared to be a portion of a skull poking out of the ground, OH 5. The dig team created a pile of stones around the exposed portion to protect it from further weathering. Active excavation began the following day; they had chosen to wait for photographer Des Bartlett to document the entire process. The partial cranium was fully unearthed on August 6, though it had to be reconstructed from its fragments that were scattered in the scree. Louis published a short summary of the find and context the following week.

Louis determined OH 5 to be a subadult or adolescent based on dental development, and he and Mary nicknamed it "Dear Boy". After they reconstructed the skull and jaws, newspapers began referring to it as "Nutcracker Man" due to the large back teeth and jaws, which gave it a resemblance to vintage nutcrackers. South African palaeoanthropologist Phillip Tobias, a colleague of the Leakeys, has also received attribution for this nickname. The cranium was taken to Kenya after its discovery and was there until January 1965 when it was placed on display in the Hall of Man at the National Museum of Tanzania in Dar es Salaam.

=== Other specimens ===
Louis preliminarily supposed OH 5 was about half a million years old; however, in 1965, American geologists Garniss Curtis and Jack Evernden dated OH 5 to 1.75 million years ago using potassium–argon dating of anortoclase crystals from an overlying tuff (volcanic ash) bed. Such an application of geochronology was unprecedented at the time.

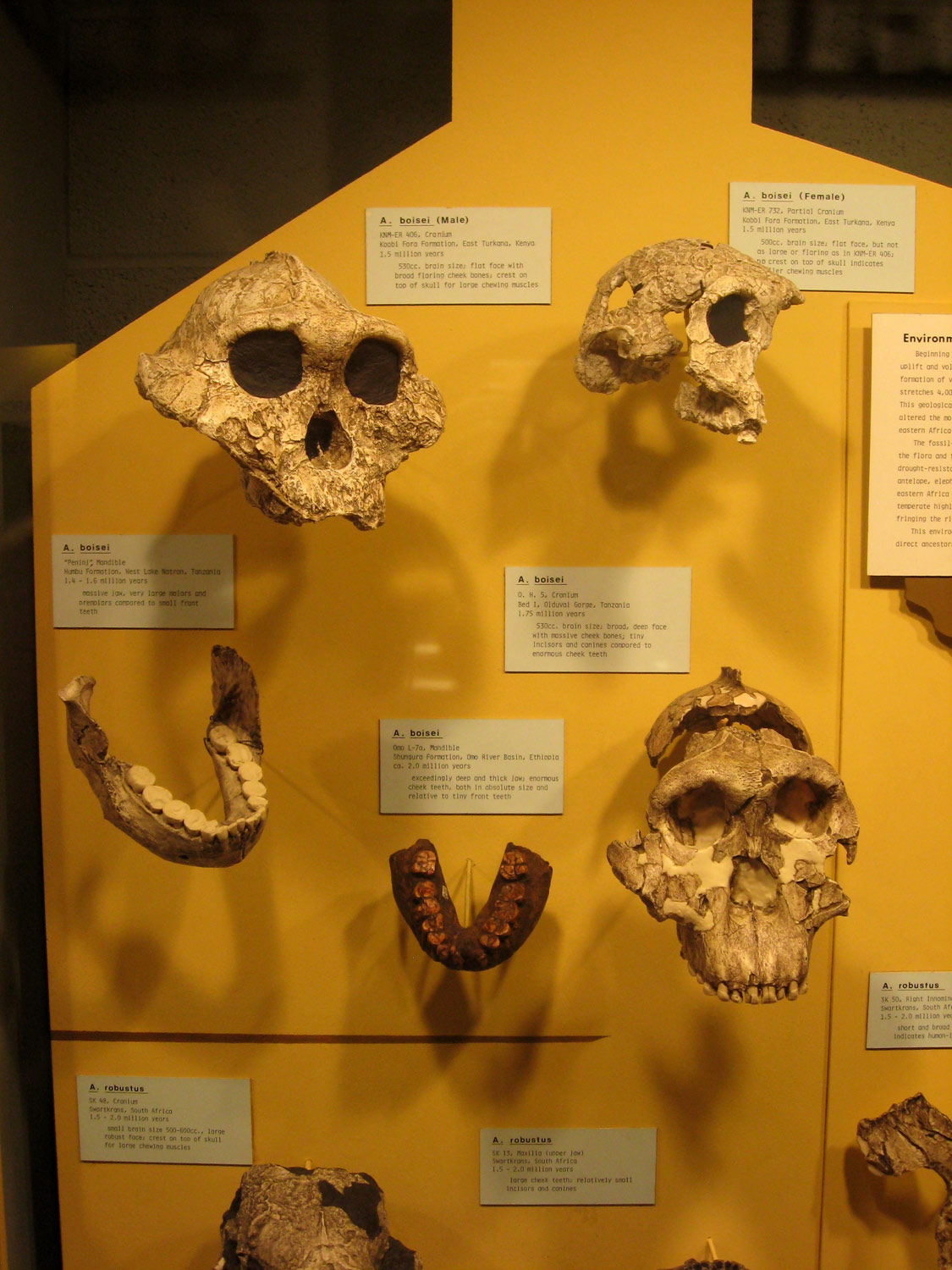
Various P. boisei specimens

The first identified jawbone, Peninj 1, was discovered Lake Natron just north of Olduvai Gorge in 1964. Especially from 1966 to 1975, several more specimens revealing facial elements were reported from the Shungura Formation, Ethiopia; Koobi Fora and Chesowanja, Kenya; and Omo and Konso, Ethiopia. Among the notable specimens found include the well preserved skull KNM-ER 406 from Koobi Fora in 1970. In 1997, the first specimen with both the skull and jawbone (and also one of the largest specimens), KGA10-525, was discovered in Konso. In 1999, a jawbone was recovered from Malema, Malawi, extending the species' southernmost range over 2,000 km (1,200 mi) from Olduvai Gorge. The first definitive bodily elements of P. boisei associated with facial elements, OH 80 (isolated teeth with an arm and a leg), were discovered in 2013. Previously, body remains lacking unambiguous diagnostic skull elements had been dubiously assigned to the species, namely the partial skeleton KNM-ER 1500 associated with a small jawbone fragment. In 2015, based on OH 80, American palaeoanthropologist Michael Lague recommended assigning the isolated humerus specimens KNM-ER 739, 1504, 6020 and 1591 from Koobi Fora to P. boisei. In 2020, the first associated hand bones were reported, KNM-ER 47000 (which also includes a nearly complete arm), from Ileret, Kenya.

=== Naming ===
The remains were clearly australopithecine (not of the genus Homo), and at the time, the only australopithecine genera described were Australopithecus by Raymond Dart and Paranthropus (the South African P. robustus) by Robert Broom, and there were arguments that Paranthropus was synonymous with Australopithecus. Louis believed the skull had a mix of traits from both genera, briefly listing 20 differences, and so used OH 5 as the basis for the new genus and species "Zinjanthropus boisei" on August 15, 1959. The genus name derives from the medieval term for East Africa, "Zanj", and the specific name was in honour of Charles Watson Boise, the Leakeys' benefactor. He initially considered the name "Titanohomo mirabilis" ("wonderful Titan-like man").

Soon after, Louis presented "Z." boisei to the 4th Pan-African Congress on Prehistory in Léopoldville, Belgian Congo (now Kinshasa, Democratic Republic of the Congo). Dart made his now famous joke, "... what would have happened if [the A. africanus specimen] Mrs. Ples had met Dear Boy one dark night." At the time of discovery, there was resistance to erecting completely new genera based on single specimens, and the Congress largely rejected "Zinjanthropus". In 1960, American anthropologist John Talbot Robinson pointed out that the supposed differences between "Zinjanthropus" and Paranthropus are due to OH 5 being slightly larger, and so recommended the species be reclassified as P. boisei. Louis rejected Robinson's proposal. Following this, it was debated if P. boisei was simply an East African variant of P. robustus until 1967 when South African palaeoanthropologist Phillip V. Tobias gave a far more detailed description of OH 5 in a monograph (edited by Louis). Tobias and Louis still retained "Zinjanthropus", but recommended demoting it to subgenus level as Australopithecus ("Zinjanthropus") boisei, considering Paranthropus to be synonymous with Australopithecus. Synonymising Paranthropus with Australopithecus was first suggested by anthropologists Sherwood Washburn and Bruce D. Patterson in 1951, who recommended limiting hominin genera to only Australopithecus and Homo.

== Classification ==
The genus Paranthropus (otherwise known as "robust australopithecines") typically includes P. boisei, P. aethiopicus and P. robustus. It is debated if Paranthropus is a valid natural grouping (monophyletic) or an invalid grouping of similar-looking hominins (paraphyletic). Because skeletal elements are so limited in these species, their affinities with each other and to other australopithecines is difficult to gauge with accuracy. The jaws are the main argument for monophyly, but such anatomy is strongly influenced by diet and environment, and could in all likelihood have evolved independently in P. boisei and P. robustus. Proponents of monophyly consider P. aethiopicus to be ancestral to the other two species, or closely related to the ancestor. Proponents of paraphyly allocate these three species to the genus Australopithecus as A. boisei, A. aethiopicus and A. robustus.

Before P. boisei was described (and P. robustus was the only member of Paranthropus), Broom and Robinson continued arguing that P. robustus and A. africanus (the then only known australopithecines) were two distinct lineages. However, remains were not firmly dated, and it was debated if there were indeed multiple hominin lineages or if there was only 1 leading to humans. In 1975, the P. boisei skull KNM-ER 406 was demonstrated to have been contemporaneous with the H. ergaster/erectus skull KNM ER 3733, which is generally taken to show that Paranthropus was a sister taxon to Homo, both developing from some Australopithecus species, which at the time only included A. africanus. In 1979, a year after describing A. afarensis from East Africa, anthropologists Donald Johanson and Tim D. White suggested that A. afarensis was instead the last common ancestor between Homo and Paranthropus, and A. africanus was the earliest member of the Paranthropus lineage or at least was ancestral to P. robustus, because A. africanus inhabited South Africa before P. robustus, and A. afarensis was at the time the oldest-known hominin species at roughly 3.5 million years old. Now, the earliest known South African australopithecine ("Little Foot") dates to 3.67 million years ago, contemporaneous with A. afarensis.

Such arguments are based on how one draws the hominin family tree, and the exact classification of Australopithecus species with each other is quite contentious. For example, if the South African A. sediba (which evolved from A. africanus) is considered the ancestor or closely related to the ancestor of Homo, then this could allow for A. africanus to be placed more closely related to Homo than to Paranthropus. This would leave the Ethiopian A. garhi as the ancestor of P. aethiopicus instead of A. africanus (assuming Paranthropus is monophyletic, and that P. aethiopicus evolved at a time in East Africa when only A. garhi existed there).

Monophyly

- - A. africanus
  - - P. aethiopicus
    - - P. boisei
      - P. robustus

Paraphyly

- - A. africanus
  - P. robustus
- - P. aethiopicus
  - P. boisei

Monophyly

- - A. africanus
    - Homo
    - Australopithecus sediba
  - - A. garhi
    - P. aethiopicus
      - P. boisei
      - P. robustus

Three example family trees with P. boisei (note, they are not absolute)

Because P. boisei and P. aethiopicus are both known from East Africa and P. aethiopicus is only confidently identified from the skull KNM WT 17000 and a few jaws and isolated teeth, it is debated if P. aethiopicus should be subsumed under P. boisei or if the differences stemming from archaicness justifies species distinction. The terms P. boisei sensu lato ("in the broad sense") and P. boisei sensu stricto ("in the strict sense") can be used to respectively include and exclude P. aethiopicus from P. boisei when discussing the lineage as a whole.

African Hominin timeline

P. aethiopicus is the earliest member of the genus, with the oldest remains, from the Ethiopian Omo Kibish Formation, dated to 2.6 million years ago (mya) at the end of the Pliocene. It is possible that P. aethiopicus evolved even earlier, up to 3.3 mya, on the expansive Kenyan floodplains of the time. The oldest P. boisei remains date to about 2.3 mya from Malema. The youngest record of P. boisei comes Olduvai Gorge (OH 80) about 1.34 mya; however, due a large gap in the hominin fossil record, P. boisei may have persisted until 1 mya. P. boisei changed remarkably little over its nearly one-million-year existence.

== Anatomy ==
=== Skull ===
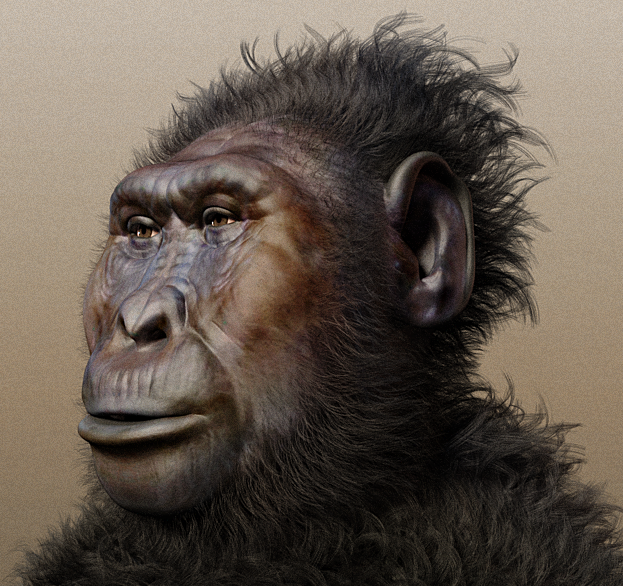
Reconstruction of P. boisei by Cicero Moraes

P. boisei is the most robust of the robust australopithecines, whereas the South African P. robustus is smaller with comparatively more gracile features. The P. boisei skull is heavily built, and features a defined brow ridge, receding forehead, rounded bottom margins of the eye sockets, inflated and concave cheek bones, a thick palate, and a robust and deep jawbone. This is generally interpreted as having allowed P. boisei to resist high stresses while chewing, though the thick palate could instead be a byproduct of facial lengthening. The skull features large rough patches (rugosities) on the cheek and jawbones, and males have pronounced sagittal (on the midline) and temporonuchal (on the back) crests, which indicate a massive masseter muscle (used in biting down) placed near the front of the head (increasing mechanical advantage). This is typically considered to be evidence of a high bite force.

The incisors and canines are reduced, which would hinder biting off chunks of large food pieces. In contrast, the cheek teeth of both sexes are enormous (postcanine megadontia), and the greater surface area would have permitted the processing of larger quantities of food at once. In the upper jaw, the 1st molar averages roughly 250 mm^{2} (0.39 sq in), the 2nd molar 320 mm^{2} (0.50 sq in), and the 3rd molar 315 mm^{2} (0.488 sq in); in the lower jaw, the 1st molar averages roughly 260 mm^{2} (0.40 sq in), the 2nd molar 315 mm^{2} (0.488 sq in), and the 3rd molar 340 mm^{2} (0.53 sq in). The molars are bunodont, featuring low and rounded cusps. The premolars resemble molars (are molarised), which may indicate P. boisei required an extended chewing surface for processing a lot of food at the same time. The enamel on the cheek teeth are among the thickest of any known ape, which would help resist high stresses while biting.

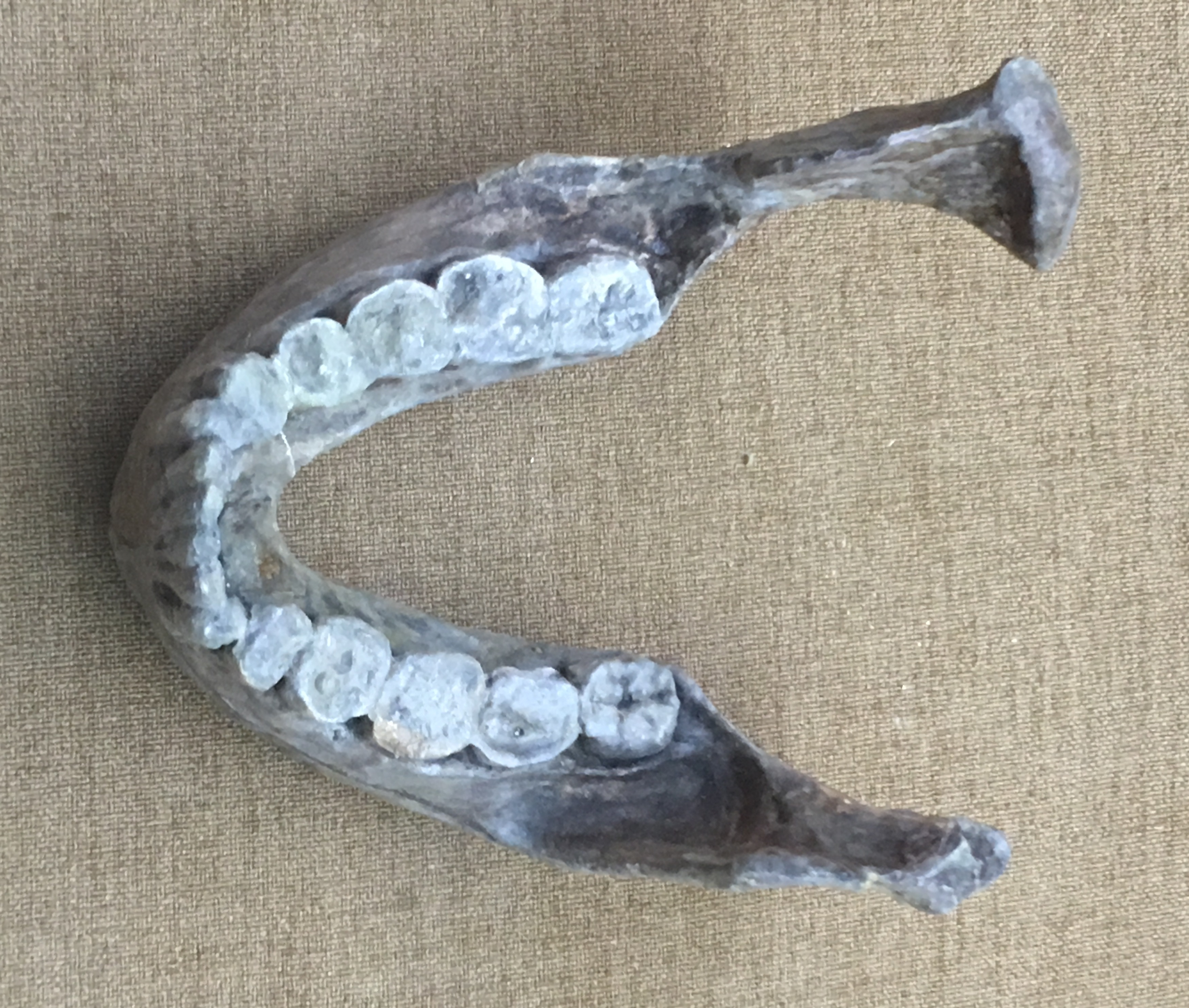
Peninj 1 showing postcanine megadontia

=== Brain and sinuses ===
In a sample of 10 P. boisei specimens, brain size varied from 444–545 cc (27.1–33.3 cu in) with an average of 487.5 cc (29.75 cu in). However, the lower-end specimen, Omo L338‐y6, is a juvenile, and many skull specimens have a highly damaged or missing frontal bone, which can alter brain volume estimates. The brain volume of australopithecines generally ranged from 400–500 cc (24–31 cu in), and for contemporary Homo 500–900 cc (31–55 cu in).

Regarding the dural venous sinuses, in 1983, American neuroanthropologist Dean Falk and anthropologist Glenn Conroy suggested that, unlike A. africanus or modern humans, all Paranthropus (and A. afarensis) had expanded occipital and marginal (around the foramen magnum) sinuses, completely supplanting the transverse and sigmoid sinuses. In 1988, Falk and Tobias demonstrated that hominins can have both an occipital/marginal and transverse/sigmoid systems concurrently or on opposite halves of the skull, such as with the P. boisei specimen KNM-ER 23000.

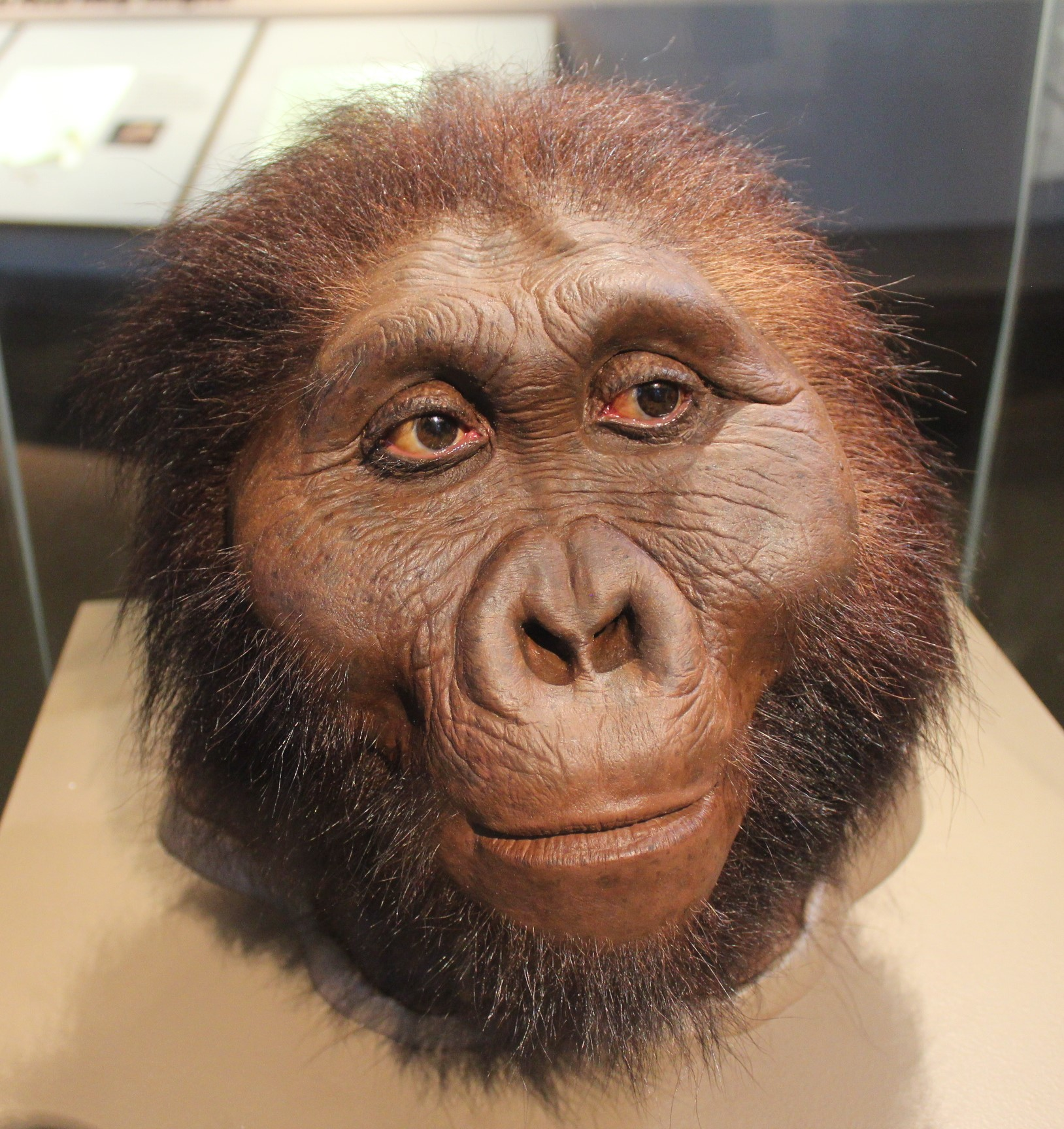
Paranthropus boisei facial reconstruction at the Smithsonian National Museum of Natural History

In 1983, French anthropologist Roger Saban stated that the parietal branch of the middle meningeal artery originated from the posterior branch in P. boisei and P. robustus instead of the anterior branch as in earlier hominins, and considered this a derived characteristic due to increased brain capacity. It has since been demonstrated that the parietal branch could originate from either the anterior or posterior branches, sometimes both in a single specimen on opposite sides of the skull as in KNM-ER 23000 and OH 5.

=== Postcranium ===
The wide range of size variation in skull specimens seems to indicate a great degree of sexual dimorphism with males being notably bigger than females. However, it is difficult to predict with accuracy the true dimensions of living males and females due to the lack of definitive P. boisei skeletal remains, save for the presumed male OH 80. Based on an approximation of 400 mm (1.3 ft) for the femur before it was broken and using modern humanlike proportions (which is probably an unsafe assumption), OH 80 was about 156.3 cm (5 ft 1.5 in) tall in life. For comparison, modern human men and women in the year 1900 averaged 163 cm (5 ft 4 in) and 152.7 cm (5.01 ft), respectively. The femoral head, the best proxy for estimating body mass, is missing, but using the shaft, OH 80 weighed about 50 kg (110 lb) assuming humanlike proportions, and 61.7 kg (136 lb) using the proportions of a non-human ape. The ambiguously attributed, presumed female femur KNM-ER 1500 is estimated to have been of an individual about 124 cm (4 ft 1 in) tall, which would be consistent with the argument of sexual dimorphism, but if the specimen does indeed belong to P. boisei, it would show a limb anatomy quite similar to that of the contemporary H. habilis.

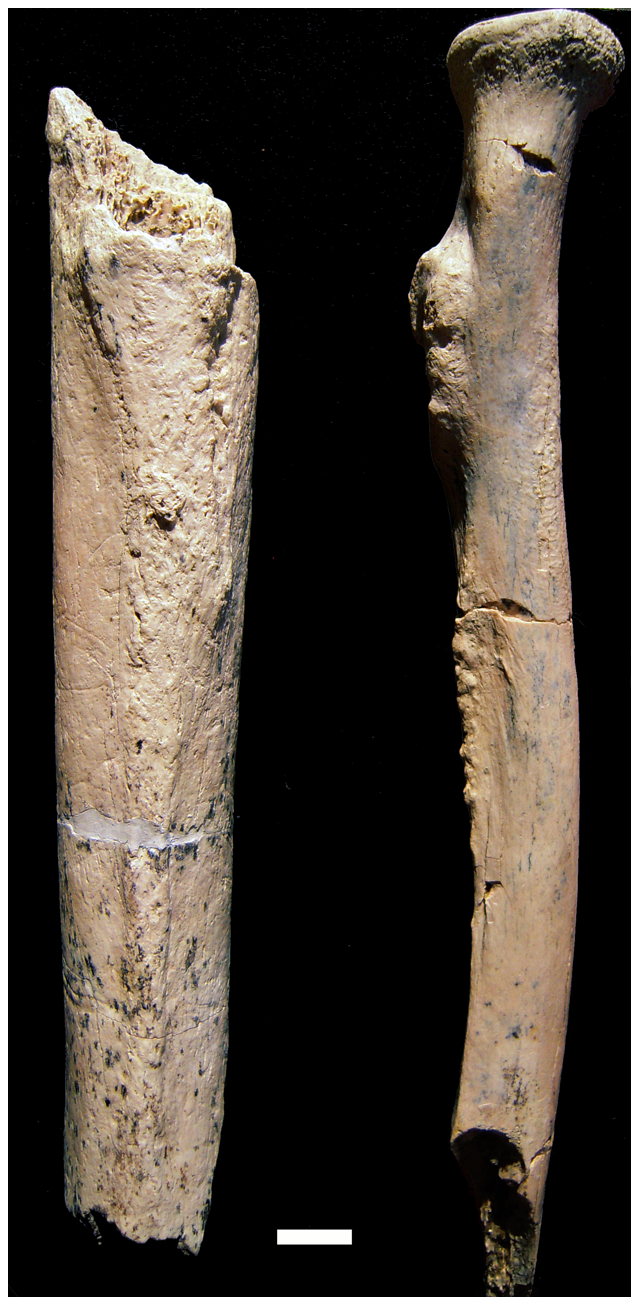
OH 80 femoral shaft (left) and radius (right) Scale bar=1 cm (0.39 in)

Instead, the OH 80 femur, more like H. erectus femora, is quite thick, features a laterally flattened shaft, and indicates similarly arranged gluteal, pectineal and intertrochanteric lines around the hip joint. Nonetheless, the intertrochanteric line is much more defined in OH 80, the gluteal tuberosity is more towards the midline of the femur, and the mid-shaft in side-view is straighter, which likely reflect some difference in load-bearing capabilities of the leg. Unlike P. robustus, the arm bones of OH 80 are heavily built, and the elbow joint shows similarities to that of modern gibbons and orangutans. This could either indicate that P. boisei used a combination of terrestrial walking as well as suspensory behaviour, or was completely bipedal but retained an ape-like upper body condition from some ancestor species due to a lack of selective pressure to lose them. In contrast, the P. robustus hand is not consistent with climbing. The hand of KNM-ER 47000 shows Australopithecus-like anatomy lacking the third metacarpal styloid process (which allows the hand to lock into the wrist to exert more pressure), a weak thumb compared to modern humans, and curved phalanges (finger bones) which are typically interpreted as adaptations for climbing. Nonetheless, despite lacking a particularly forceful precision grip like Homo, the hand was still dextrous enough to handle and manufacture simple tools.

== Palaeobiology ==
=== Diet ===
In 1954, Robinson suggested that the heavily built skull of Paranthropus (at the time only including P. robustus) was indicative of a specialist diet specifically adapted for processing a narrow band of foods. Because of this, the predominant model of Paranthropus extinction for the latter half of the 20th century was that it was unable to adapt to the volatile climate of the Pleistocene, unlike the much more adaptable Homo. It was also once thought P. boisei cracked open nuts and similar hard foods with its powerful teeth, giving OH 5 the nickname "Nutcracker Man".

However, in 1981, English anthropologist Alan Walker found that the microwearing patterns on the molars were inconsistent with a diet high in hard foods, and were effectively indistinguishable from the pattern seen in the molars of fruit-eating (frugivorous) mandrills, chimpanzees and orangutans. The microwearing on P. boisei molars is different from that on P. robustus molars, and indicates that P. boisei, unlike P. robustus, very rarely ever ate hard foods. Patterns of tooth chipping in P. boisei further demonstrate against the hypothesis that it fed on hard, brittle foods. Carbon isotope analyses report a diet of predominantly C_{4} plants, such as low quality and abrasive grasses and sedges, a finding bolstered by more indirect evidence that P. boisei went extinct during a time of significant shrinkage of C_{4} grasslands in Africa. Thick enamel is consistent with grinding abrasive foods. The microwear patterns in P. robustus have been thoroughly examined, and suggest that the heavy build of the skull was only relevant when eating less desirable fallback foods. A similar scheme may have been in use by P. boisei. Such a strategy is similar to that used by modern gorillas, which can sustain themselves entirely on lower quality fallback foods year-round, as opposed to lighter built chimps (and presumably gracile australopithecines) which require steady access to high quality foods.

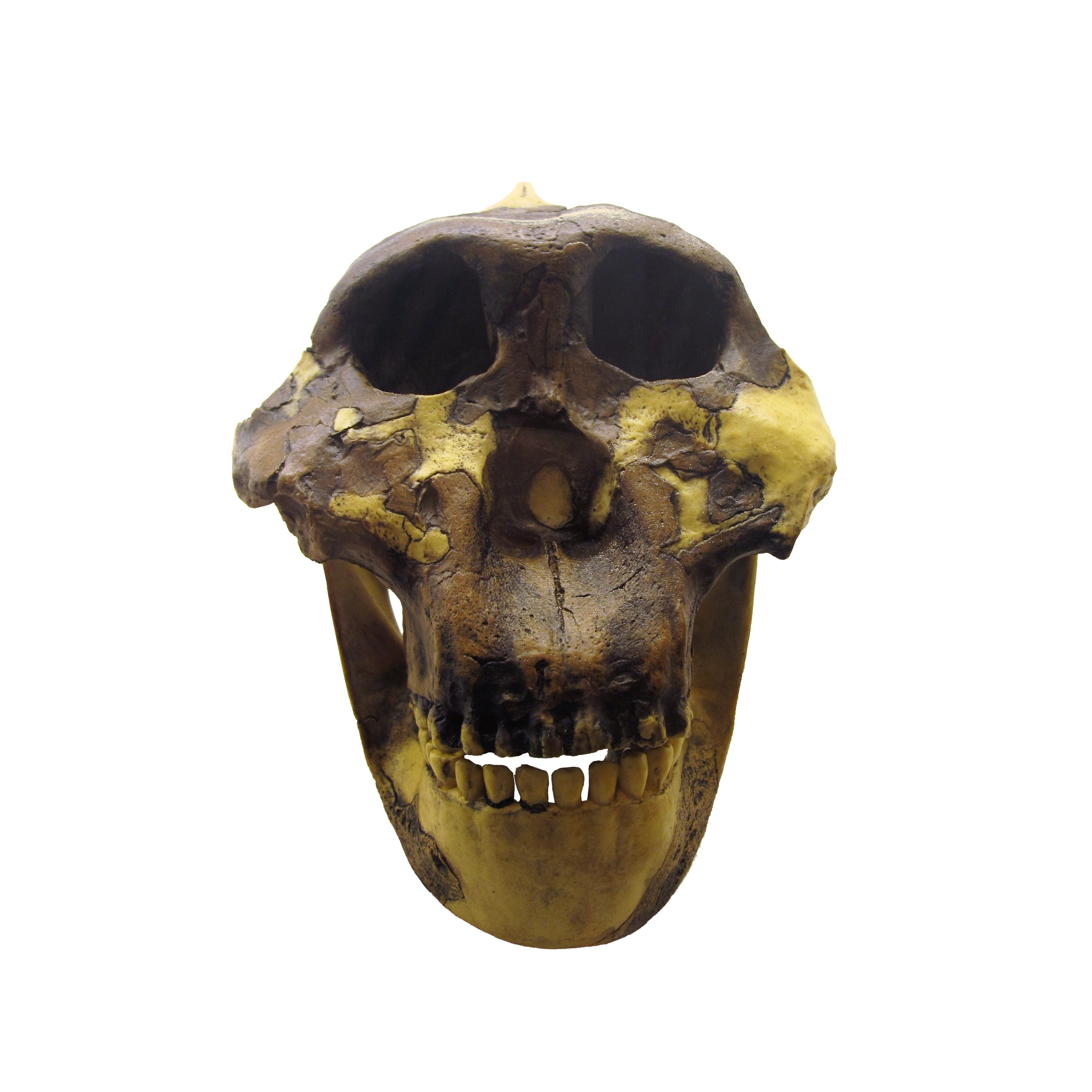
Reconstruction of MGL 95211 skull and jaw

In 1980, anthropologists Tom Hatley and John Kappelman suggested that early hominins (convergently with bears and pigs) adapted to eating abrasive and calorie-rich underground storage organs (USOs), such as roots and tubers. Since then, hominin exploitation of USOs has gained more support. In 2005, biological anthropologists Greg Laden and Richard Wrangham proposed that Paranthropus relied on USOs as a fallback or possibly primary food source, and noted that there may be a correlation between high USO abundance and hominin occupation. In this model, P. boisei may have been a generalist feeder with a predilection for USOs, and may have gone extinct due to an aridity trend and a resultant decline in USOs in tandem with increasing competition with baboons and Homo. Like modern chimps and baboons, australopithecines likely foraged for food in the cooler morning and evening instead of in the heat of the day.

=== Technology ===
By the time OH 5 was discovered, the Leakeys had spent 24 years excavating the area for early hominin remains, but had instead recovered mainly other animal remains as well as the Oldowan stone tool industry. Because OH 5 was associated with the tools and processed animal bones, they presumed it was the toolmaker. Attribution of the tools was promptly switched to the bigger-brained H. habilis upon its description in 1964. In 2013, OH 80 was found associated with a mass of Oldowan stone tools and animal bones bearing evidence of butchery. This could potentially indicate P. boisei was manufacturing this industry and ate meat to some degree.

Additionally, the Early Stone Age of Africa coincides with simple bone tools. In South Africa, these are unearthed in the Cradle of Humankind and are largely attributed to P. robustus. In East Africa, a few have been encountered at Olduvai Gorge Beds I–IV, occurring over roughly 1.7 to 0.8 million years ago, and are usually made of limb bones and possibly teeth of large mammals, most notably elephants. The infrequency of such large animals at this site may explain the relative rarity of bone tools. The toolmakers were modifying bone in much the same way as they did with stone. Though the Olduvan bone tools are normally ascribed to H. ergaster/erectus, the presence of both P. boisei and H. habilis obfuscates attribution.

=== Social structure ===
In 1979, American biological anthropologist Noel T. Boaz noticed that the relative proportions between large mammal families at the Shungura Formation are quite similar to the proportion in modern-day across sub-Saharan Africa. Boaz believed that hominins would have had about the same population density as other large mammals, which would equate to 0.006–1.7 individuals per square kilometre (0.4 square mile). Alternatively, by multiplying the density of either bovids, elephants, or hippos by the percentage of hominin remains out of total mammal remains found at the formation, Boaz estimated a density of 0.001–2.58 individuals per square kilometre. Biologist Robert A. Martin considered population models based on the number of known specimens to be flimsy. In 1981, Martin applied equations formulated by ecologists Alton S. Harestad and Fred L. Bunnel in 1979 to estimate the home range and population density of large mammals based on weight and diet, and, using a weight of 52.4 kg (116 lb), he got: 130 ha (320 acres) and 0.769 individual per square kilometre if herbivorous; 1,295 ha (3,200 acres) and 0.077 individual if omnivorous; and 287,819 ha (711,220 acres) and 0.0004 individual if carnivorous. For comparison, he calculated 953 ha (2,350 acres) and 0.104 individual per square kilometre for omnivorous, 37.5-kilogram (83 lb) chimps.

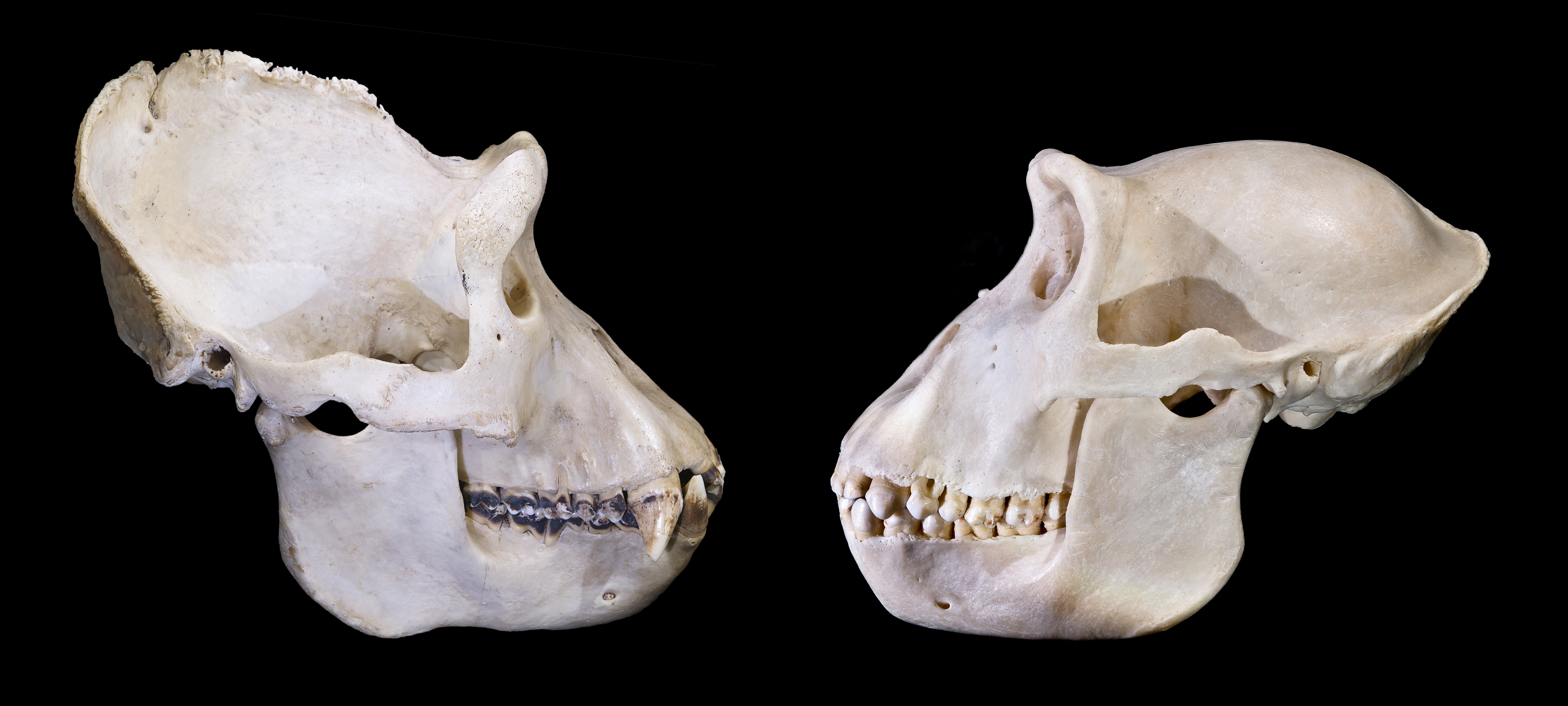
Male (left) and female (right) western gorilla skulls

A 2017 study postulated that, because male non-human great apes have a larger sagittal crest than females (particularly gorillas and orangutans), the crest may be influenced by sexual selection in addition to supporting chewing muscles. Further, the size of the sagittal crest (and the gluteus muscles) in male western lowland gorillas has been correlated with reproductive success. They extended their interpretation of the crest to the males of Paranthropus species, with the crest and resultantly larger head (at least in P. boisei) being used for some kind of display. This contrasts with other primates which flash the typically engorged canines in agonistic display (the canines of Paranthropus are comparatively small). However, it is also possible that male gorillas and orangutans require larger temporalis muscles to achieve a wider gape to better display the canines.

=== Development ===
Australopithecines are generally considered to have had a faster, apelike growth rate than modern humans largely due to dental development trends. Broadly speaking, the emergence of the first permanent molar in early hominins has been variously estimated anywhere from 2.5 to 4.5 years of age, which all contrast markedly with the modern human average of 5.8 years. The tips of the mesial cusps of the 1st molar (on the side closest to the premolar) of KNM-ER 1820 were at about the same level as the cervix (where the enamel meets the cementum) of its non-permanent 2nd premolar. In baboons, this stage occurs when the 1st molar is about to erupt from the gums. The tooth root is about 5 mm (0.20 in), which is similar to most other hominins at this stage. In contrast, the root of the P. robustus specimen SK 62 was 6 mm (0.24 in) when emerging through the dental alveolus (an earlier stage of development than gum emergence), so, unless either specimen is abnormal, P. robustus may have had a higher tooth-root formation rate. The specimen's 1st molar may have erupted 2–3 months before death, so possibly at 2.7–3.3 years of age. In modern apes (including humans), dental development trajectory is strongly correlated with life history and overall growth rate, but it is possible that early hominins simply had a faster dental trajectory and slower life history due to environmental factors, such as early weaning age exhibited in modern indriid lemurs.

== Palaeoecology ==
P. boisei remains have been found predominantly in what were wet, wooded environments, such as wetlands along lakes and rivers, wooded or arid shrublands, and semi-arid woodlands, with the exception of the savanna-dominated Malawian Chiwondo Beds. Its abundance likely increased during precession-driven periods of relative humidity while being more rare during intervals of aridity. During the Pleistocene, there seems to have been coastal and montane forests in Eastern Africa. More expansive river valleys–namely the Omo River Valley–may have served as important refuges for forest-dwelling creatures. Being cut off from the forests of Central Africa by a savanna corridor, these East African forests would have promoted high rates of endemism, especially during times of climatic volatility. Australopithecines and early Homo likely preferred cooler conditions than later Homo, as there are no australopithecine sites that were below 1,000 m (3,300 ft) in elevation at the time of deposition. This would mean that, like chimps, they often inhabited areas with an average diurnal temperature of 25 °C (77 °F), dropping to 10 or 5 °C (50 or 41 °F) at night.

P. boisei coexisted with H. habilis, H. rudolfensis and H. ergaster/erectus, but it is unclear how they interacted. To explain why P. boisei was associated with Oldowan tools despite not being the tool maker, Louis Leakey and colleagues, when describing H. habilis in 1964, suggested that one possibility was P. boisei was killed by H. habilis, perhaps as food. However, when describing P. boisei five years earlier, he said, "There is no reason whatever, in this case, to believe that the skull [OH 5] represents the victim of a cannibalistic feast by some hypothetical more advanced type of man." OH 80 seems to have been eaten by a big cat. The leg OH 35, which either belongs to P. boisei or H. habilis, shows evidence of leopard predation. Other likely Oldowan predators of great apes include the hunting hyena Chasmaporthetes nitidula, the sabertoothed cats Dinofelis and Megantereon, and the crocodile Crocodylus anthropophagus. P. boisei was also the probable origin of genital herpes (HSV-2) in modern humans. They likely contracted the disease by consuming infected chimp meat. The disease then spread from P. boisei to Homo erectus the same way, as interactions between the two species would have been common around sources of water. An infection of cold sores (HSV-1), may have provided an initial layer of protection from HSV-2, until the disease "adapted to a different mucosal niche".

== See also ==
- African archaeology
- Australopithecus anamensis – Extinct hominin from Pliocene East Africa
- Australopithecus africanus – Extinct hominid from South Africa
- Australopithecus sediba – Extinct hominin from South Africa
- Homo ergaster – Extinct species or subspecies of archaic human
- Homo habilis – Archaic human species from 2.4 to 1.65 mya
- Homo rudolfensis – Extinct hominin from the Early Pleistocene of East Africa
- Oldowan – Archaeological culture
- Paranthropus aethiopicus – Extinct species of hominin of East Africa
- Paranthropus robustus – Extinct species of hominin of South Africa

== Bibliography ==
- Boaz, Noel (1998). Quarry Closing In On the Missing Link. New York: Simon & Schuster. ISBN 0-684-86378-2.
- Bowman-Kruhm, Mary (2005). The Leakeys: A Biography. Greenwood Publishing Group. ISBN 0-313-32985-0.
- Cachel, Susan (2006). Primate and Human Evolution. Cambridge: Cambridge University Press. ISBN 0-521-82942-9.
- Cela-Conde, Camilo; Ayala, Francisco (2007). Human Evolution: Trails from the Past. Oxford: Oxford University Press. ISBN 978-0-19-856780-6.
- Cracraft, Joel; Donoghue, Michael (2004). Assembling the Tree of Life. Oxford: Oxford University Press. ISBN 0-19-517234-5.
- Deacon, Janette (1999). Human beginnings in South Africa. Rowman Altamira. ISBN 0-7619-9086-0.
- Dunsworth, Holly (2007). Human Origins 101. Greenwood Publishing Group. ISBN 978-0-313-33673-7.
- Johanson, Donald; Edgar, Blake (1996). From Lucy to Language. Principal photography by David Brill. New York: Simon & Schuster. ISBN 0-684-81023-9.
- Leakey, Louis (August 1959). "A new fossil skull from Olduvai". Nature. 184 (4685): 491–493. Bibcode:1959Natur.184..491L. doi:10.1038/184491a0. ISSN 0028-0836. S2CID 4217460.
- Leakey, Louis (September 1960). "Finding the World's Earliest Man". National Geographic. 118 (3). ISSN 0027-9358.
- Leakey, Louis (January 1960). "The Newest Link in Human Evolution: The Discovery by L.S.B. Leakey of Zinjanthropus Boisei". Current Anthropology. 1 (1): 76–77. doi:10.1086/200077. ISSN 1537-5382. S2CID 144334361.
- Leakey, Mary (1965). Olduvai Gorge. Vol. 3: Excavations in Beds I & II, 1960–1963. London: Cambridge University Press. ISBN 0-521-07723-0.
- Leakey, Mary (1979). Olduvai Gorge: My Search for Early Man. London: Collins. ISBN 0-00-211613-8.
- Leakey, Richard (1983). One Life. London: Michael Joseph. ISBN 0-7181-2247-X.
- Lewin, Roger; Foley, Robert (2004). Principles of Human Evolution (2 ed.). Wiley-Blackwell. ISBN 0-632-04704-6.
- Morell, Virginia (1995). Ancestral Passions: The Leakey family and the Quest for Humankind's Beginnings. New York: Simon & Schuster. ISBN 0-684-82470-1.
- Spencer, Frank (1997). History of Physical Anthropology. Taylor & Francis. ISBN 0-8153-0490-0.
- Staniforth, Amy (March 2009). "Returning Zinj: curating human origins in twentieth-century Tanzania" (PDF). Journal of Eastern African Studies. 3 (1): 153–173. doi:10.1080/17531050902717203. hdl:2160/1932. ISSN 1753-1055. S2CID 145575347.
- Wilkins, Wendy; Wakefield, Jenny (1995). "Brain evolution and neurolinguistic preconditions". Behavioral and Brain Sciences. 18 (1): 161. doi:10.1017/s0140525x00037924. ISSN 0140-525X.
