= KNM-ER 406 =

Hominin fossil

KNM ER 406
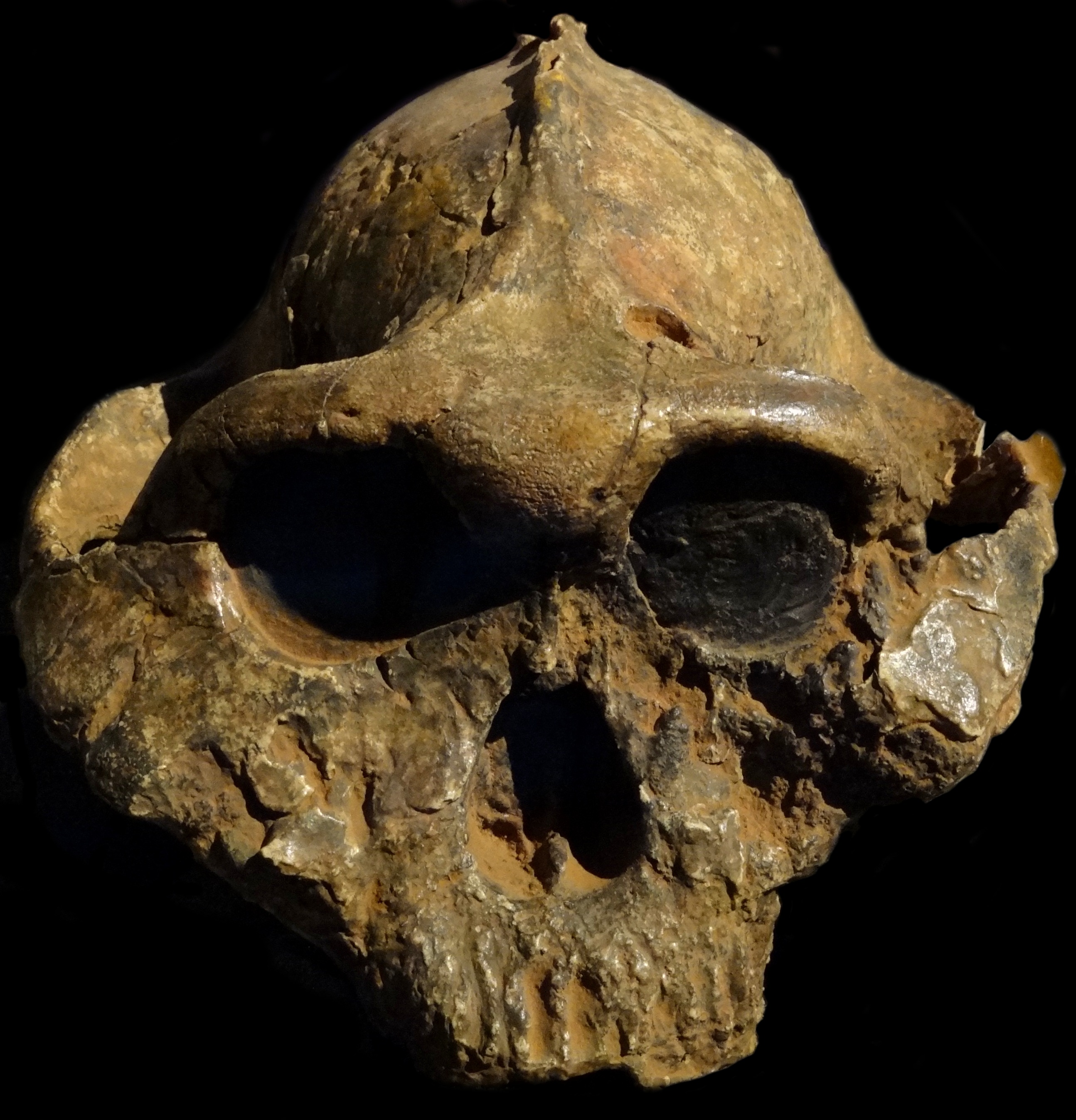
- Catalog no.: KNM ER 406
- Species: Paranthropus boisei
- Age: 1.7 million years, Lower Pleistocene
- Place discovered: Koobi Fora, Kenya
- Date discovered: 1969
- Discovered by: Richard Leakey and H. Mutua

KNM ER 406 is an almost complete fossilized skull of the species Paranthropus boisei. It was discovered in Koobi Fora, Kenya by Richard Leakey and H. Mutua in 1969. This species is grouped with the Australopitecine genus, Paranthropus boisei because of the robusticity of the skull and the prominent characteristics. This species was found well preserved with a complete cranium but lacking dentition. He was known for his robust cranial features that showed the signs of adaptation of the ecological niches. The big chewing muscles attached to the sagittal crest are traits of this adaptation.

== Discovery and classification ==
Following a three-month expedition funded by the National Museums of Kenya, Richard Leakey and H. Mutua spent the summer of 1969 in northern Kenya. This expedition along with the field work three months prior to this project was possible with the financial assistance from the Kenyan Government. During this expedition, there were two specimens that have similar characteristics as seen in the robust KNM-ER 406. The two specimens are Demi-cranium KNM-ER 732 and KNM-ER 407. These two specimens were also robust, but the skulls were considered more gracile. The smaller skulls are evidence that sexual dimorphism was the reason for the size difference. Consistent evidence of Lower Pleistocene hominids supports that there was a variation in size of the Australopithecus in East Rudolf, and not a separate species.

With the occipital only being present the morphology could not be confirmed, but the KNM-ER 406 and the other fossil found a mile North of the site are consistent with fossils found in Olduvai. It has been accepted that they are Australopithecus boisei and it's also been accepted that the A. boisei was not a tool maker.

Another species, called Homo ergaster was discovered and dated the same age as A. Boisei 1.7 million years ago. In 1975 this species was found in northern Kenya, Koobi Fora by Bernard Ngeneo. The same age of 1.7 million years ago means that different species were on the scene in Africa at the same time. Yes, they coexisted. It's known that a species can survive when they inhabit a specific ecological niche. The morphology was different because of the resources they consumed. The Homo ergaster hunted and ate softer foods and more meat. His skull looked more like modern humans. But, A. Boisei’s skull was robust and had large temporals muscles that helped crush nuts and hard plants. It's important to note that these two species coexisted.

== Anatomy ==
Cranial features and brain size

It is an adult male with an estimated cranial capacity of 510 cc and age of 1.7 million years.

Compared to the modern human and the Homo ergaster the A. boisei had a cranial capacity of 510 cc, a much smaller brain then modern humans who have a cranial capacity of 1200-1400 cc. He had striking robusticity, projecting glabella, and a well developed sagittal crest. There are feature differences of the sagittal crest in the KNM-ER 406 and the robust male gorillas and chimpanzees. Roughness appears in the sagittal crest and its located further back by the nuchal crest of gorillas and apes. The KNM-ER 406 sagittal crest is situated near the frontal bone and the highest point of the sagittal crest is located more medially. The development of the robusticity comes from the anterior part of the temporals muscles. As a result of this massiveness size of temporals muscles KNM-ER 406 shows presents of shallow orbits. This species is suggested to be male and his features are the same as Paranthropus boisei and the OH 5. This specimen is perhaps the most impressive skull found.

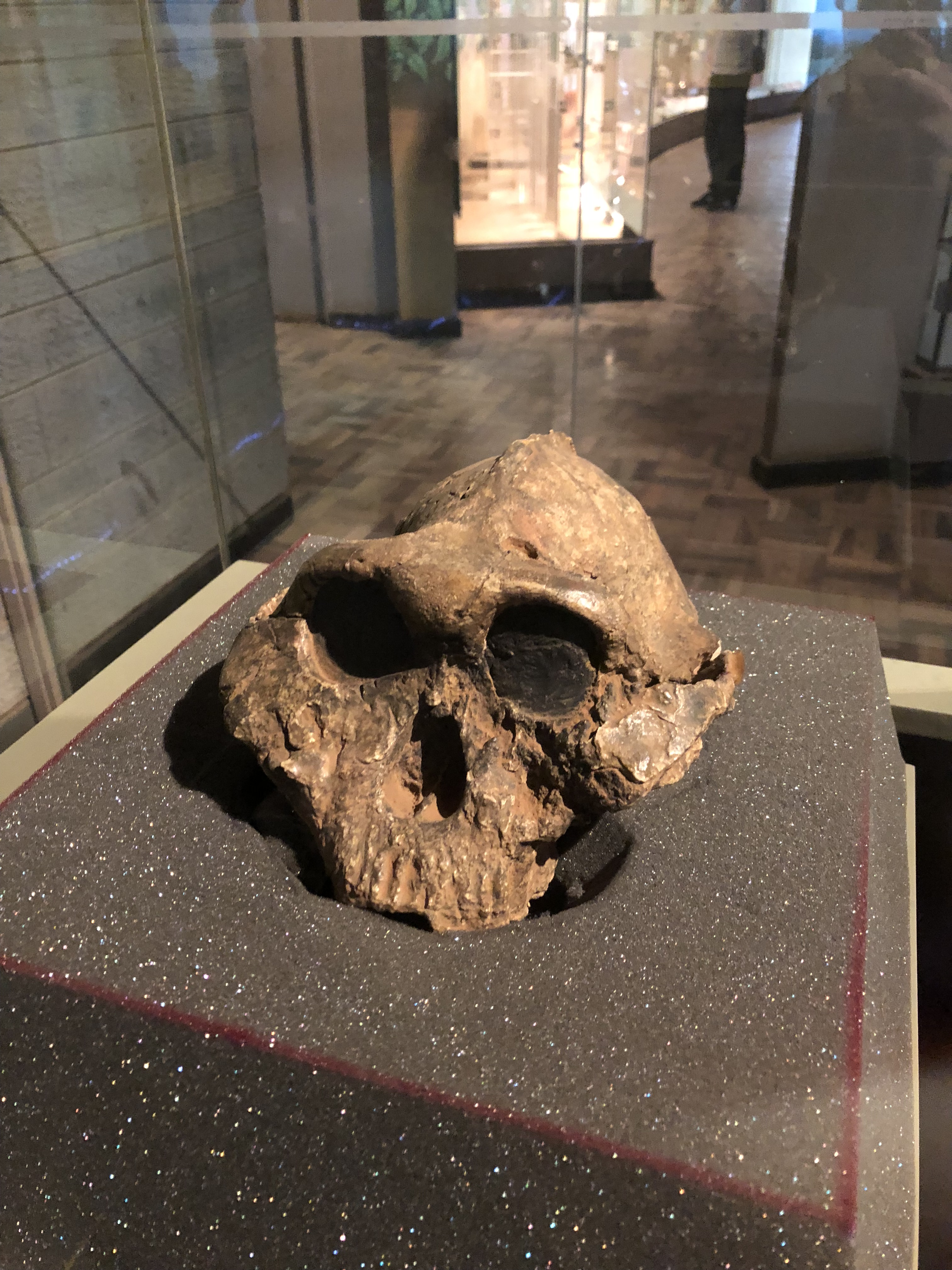
Paranthropus boisei KNM ER 406 actual skull

== See also ==
- List of fossil sites (with link directory)
- List of hominina (hominid) fossils (with images)
