= Paula Kahumbu =

Wildlife conservationist

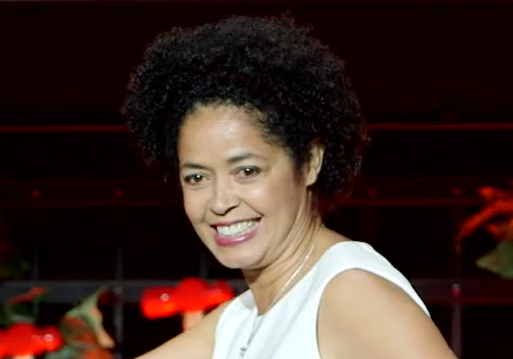
- Kahumbu in 2017
- Born: Nairobi, Kenya
- Education: University of Bristol; University of Florida, Gainesville; Princeton University; University of Pretoria
- Known for: Hands Off Our Elephants
- Awards: National Geographic - Emerging Explorer; Whitley Awards; Order of the Grand Warrior Award
- Scientific career
- Fields: Wildlife conservation
- Workplaces: WildlifeDirect
- Thesis: The effects of elephants on their habitats in the Shimba Hills, Kenya (2002)
- Doctoral advisor: Dan Rubenstein; Andrew Dobson
- Website: Personal website

Paula Kahumbu is a wildlife conservationist and chief executive officer of WildlifeDirect. She is best known as a campaigner for elephants and wildlife, spearheading the Hands Off Our Elephants Campaign, which was launched in 2014 with Kenyan First Lady Margaret Kenyatta. She was recently appointed in 2022 as the first National Geographical Explorer as a board of trustees member at the National Geographic Society.

== Education and early career ==
Kahumbu was born on June 25, 1966, and grew up in Nairobi, Kenya, and there attended primary and secondary school at Loreto Convent Msongari. She was first mentored by the renowned conservationist Richard Leakey. She was granted a Government of Kenya Scholarship to study ecology and biology at the University of Bristol. She then received her master's degree at the University of Florida in Wildlife and Range Science in 1992. Her early studies and fieldwork centered on primates, writing her master's thesis on the monkeys of the Tana River Primate National Reserve.

Between undergraduate and graduate school, Kahumbu returned to Kenya to work for the Kenya Wildlife Service. There, she was charged with counting and measuring the ivory stockpile in the country's vaults in preparation for Richard Leakey's now-famous internationally televised burning of the tusks. The event changed her focus from primates to elephants for her doctoral work. She was granted a Petri scholarship to attend Princeton University to complete her PhD in Ecology and Evolutionary Biology from 1994 to 2002, where she studied elephants in the Shimba Hills on the Kenyan coast. In 2005, she received her certificate in the Program for Management Development from the Gordon Institute of Business Sciences at the University of Pretoria.

== Conservation career ==
After receiving her PhD, Kahumbu returned to the Kenya Wildlife Service and led the Kenyan delegation to the Convention on International Trade in Endangered Species. In 2007, Kahumbu became the executive director of WildlifeDirect, a nonprofit organization co-founded in 2004 by her mentor Richard Leakey as an online platform to provide a voice to African conservationists. The organization has since become the largest wildlife blogging site in Africa and has covered a diverse array of conservation issues—from protecting chimpanzees in Sierra Leone to African painted dogs in Zimbabwe. Those inspired by the blog posts can then donate directly to the conservationists on the ground, circumventing administrative fees.

The "Hands Off Our Elephants" campaign was launched by Kahumbu at WildlifeDirect to put an end to the poaching of elephants and trafficking of ivory and has since gained the support of Kenyan First Lady Margaret Kenyatta. The campaign aims to leverage media to drive behavior change and to foster agency within the local community to take action. In tandem, the campaign has worked to propose concrete legislation to enforce against the illegal ivory trade. When the campaign began in 2014, more than 100,000 elephants across the African continent had been killed for their ivory over three years.

Kahumbu also teaches conservation to students as a lecturer at Princeton University, where she leads an undergraduate course in community conservation during an annual field course in Kenya.

== Public engagement ==
Kahumbu has reached the public through a variety of mediums to advocate for conservation—from television to editorials to museums. She is the producer of NTV Wild, an award-winning wildlife documentary series, and NTV Wild Talk, a television show hosted by Smriti Vidyarthi that covers conservation issues. She has also contributed regularly to The Guardian, advocating for protection of elephants through a solutions-based approach—from ending corruption to inspiring a young generation of conservationists—and denouncing the ivory trade. Kahumbu is also a chairperson for the National Museums of Kenya.

Kahumbu is also an accomplished children's book writer, co-authoring global bestsellers like Owen and Mzee: The True Story of a Remarkable Friendship, based on the unlikely friendship of a hippopotamus and an Aldabra giant tortoise named Owen and Mzee.

On 23 May 2024, Kahumbu was among the guests invited to the state dinner hosted by U.S. President Joe Biden in honor of President William Ruto at the White House.

== Awards and honors ==
- National Geographic Buffet Award Winner for conservation leadership in Africa, 2011.
- National Geographic Emerging Explorer Award, 2011.
- Special Commendation, United Nations Person of the Year Award, 2013.
- Order of the Grand Warrior Award, Kenyan Ministry of Environment, Water and Natural Resources, 2014.
- Whitley Award Winner, donated by The LJC Fund in memory of Anthea and Lindsey Turner, 2014.
- Round Square Idealist, 2015.
- Rolex National Geographic Explorer of the Year, June 2021.
- Royal Geographical Society winner of the inaugural Esmond B. Martin RGS Prize, 2023, for innovative conservation practice and education.
