= Robert Corruccini =

American anthropologist

Robert S. Corruccini
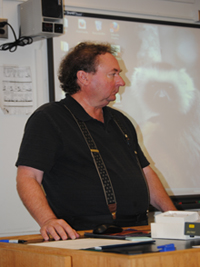
- Robert S. Corruccini in 2010
- Born: May 21, 1949 (age 77); Takoma Park, Maryland
- Education: Ph.D. in anthropology, University of California, Berkeley (1975)
- Occupation: Anthropologist
- Spouse(s): Carol A. Morrow, PhD
- Children: 2

Robert Spencer Corruccini (born May 21, 1949) is an American anthropologist, distinguished professor, Smithsonian Institution Research Fellow, Human Biology Council Fellow (now the Human Biology Association), and the 1994 Outstanding Scholar at Southern Illinois University-Carbondale. As a medical and dental anthropologist, Corruccini is most noted for his work on the theory of malocclusion and his extensive work in a slave cemetery at Newton Plantation in Barbados.

== Academic life ==
Corruccini earned his B.A. in Anthropology and Geology at the University of Colorado, Boulder in 1971, and his Ph.D. in Anthropology and Paleontology from the University of California, Berkeley in 1975. He was named an Aleš Hrdlička Scholar in 1975-1976 by the Smithsonian Institution, later becoming a communications coordinator for the Universities Space Research Association in Boulder, Colorado.

In 1977, Corruccini returned to his alma mater, teaching anthropology at the University of Colorado, Boulder. In 1978, he joined the Anthropology Department at Southern Illinois University-Carbondale as a tenure-track assistant professor, later earning a full professorship in 1986. It was at this university where Corruccini met, and later married, archaeologist Carol A. Morrow. Morrow is now professor of anthropology at Southeast Missouri State University.

=== Human dentition ===
As a dental anthropologist, Corruccini is most noted for his work on malocclusion, though his research is not limited to any particular aspect of human or non-human primate dentition or biology. Much of his early fieldwork in dentition and many of his 250-plus publications focused on twins, immigrants, Australian Aborigines, and on the Indian subcontinent, with this research being funded by the Harry Frank Guggenheim Foundation, the Smithsonian Institution, and the Leakey Foundation. However, Corruccini's research into malocclusion led him to conduct broad and comprehensive studies among a diverse number of subjects, including an isolate population of European-Americans in rural Kentucky, the Pima Tribe, natives of Peru, hominoids, and modern Chinese.

==== Theory of malocclusion ====
Corruccini's long term research into the origins of malocclusion led him to the conclusion that not all cases could be solely attributed to genetic factors. In 1982, Corruccini and Beecher published the results of a study on squirrel monkeys that revealed that diet may play a significant role in occlusal health. Corruccini later asserted that the consumption of a western diet, or "Industrial Diet" may be one of the factors responsible for the swelling epidemic of malocclusions now appearing in modern human populations in western countries. Subsequent studies conducted by other scientists confirm the rise of malocclusions in modern humans.

In his review of Noel T. Boaz's, Evolving Health: The Origins of Illness and How the Modern World is Making Us Sick, Corruccini states,

"...More than half of modern Western people have crooked teeth judged as needing orthodontic intervention (many less receive it due to economic constraints), and more than 50% of industrialized persons need refractive adjustment through lenses. Boaz attributes myopia to degeneration (self-domestication: p. 179) which is an old and disproven genetic etiology for both visual and dental anomalies (Corruccini, 1999), yet these anomalies are much closer to the “norm” for modernized people than to being an aberration. Could aboriginals have survived with such impediments more than 20,000 years ago? A majority of living modern people are relevant to the answer, which contrasts with the relatively few victims of the fatal diseases. True, the latter are more terminal, but the former have more to say about what afflicts the majority of us all, and they yield more statistical explanatory power..."

=== Research at Newton plantation ===
Not long after Corruccini's arrival in Carbondale, he commenced a collaborative research study with Jerome Handler focusing on slave populations who were buried in Barbados circa 1660-1820, a collaboration that would span over a decade and result in numerous publications. Handler joined the faculty at Southern Illinois University-Carbondale in 1962, first as an instructor, and later as a tenured professor after he earned his PhD in anthropology from Brandeis University in 1965. Corruccini and Handler's first publication together on the Newton sugar plantation was based on a study of the slaves' dentition. This and subsequent research was funded by associations such as the National Science Foundation, the Wenner-Gren Foundation for Anthropological Research, Southern Illinois University Office of Development and Research, and the National Geographic Society.

== Select publications ==
=== Books ===
- R.S. Corruccini. Primate Behavior and Sociobiology: Selected Papers from the VIII International Congress of Primatology, (co-edited with A.B. Chiarelli), Heidelberg: Springer-Verlag, 1981.
- R.S. Corruccini. Primate Evolutionary Biology: Selected Papers from the VIII International Congress of Primatology, (co-edited with A.B. Chiarelli), Heidelberg: Springer-Verlag, 1981.
- R.S. Corruccini. Advanced Views on Primate Biology: Proceedings of the Main Session, VIII International Congress of Primatology, Florence, July 7–11, 1980, (co-edited by A.B. Chiarelli), Heidelberg: Springer-Verlag, 1982.
- R.S. Corruccini. New Interpretations of Ape and Human Ancestry, (co-edited with R.L. Ciochon), New York: Plenum Press, 1983, ISBN 0-306-41072-9
- R.S. Corruccini. HALLA: Demographic Consequences of the Partition of the Punjab, 1947 (Corruccini and S.S. Kaul), Lanham: University Press of America, 1990, ISBN 0-8191-7849-7
- R.S. Corruccini. Integrative Paths to the Past: Paleoanthropological Advances in Honor of F. Clark Howell, (co-edited with R.L. Ciochon), New York: Prentice-Hall, 1994,ISBN 0-13-706773-9
- R.S. Corruccini. Multivariate Analysis in Bioanthropology, (co-edited with G.N. van Vark and W. Schaafsma), Journal of Quantitative Anthropology, Volume 5 Number 3, July 1995, 83 pp.
- R.S. Corruccini. How Anthropology Informs the Orthodontic Diagnosis of Malocclusion’s Causes, Lewiston: Edwin Mellen Press, 1999, ISBN 0-7734-7980-5
- R.S. Corruccini. The Human Experience: A Recitation Manual for Anthropology, (with A. Balkansky and M. Harrison), Dubuque: Kendall-Hunt, 2007, ISBN 978-0-7575-6652-3

=== Peer-reviewed articles ===
- R.S. Corruccini. 1972a. The Biological Relationships of Some Prehistoric and Historic Pueblo Populations. American Journal of Physical Anthropology 37:373-388.
- R.S. Corruccini. 1972b. Allometry Correction in Taximetrics. Systematic Zoology 21:375-383.
- R.S. Corruccini. 1973. Size and Shape in Similarity oefficients Based on Metric Characters. American Journal of Physical Anthropology 38:743-753.
- R.S. Corruccini. 1974a. An Examination of the Meaning of Cranial Discrete Traits for Human Skeletal Biological Studies. American Journal of Physical Anthropology 40: 425-445.
- R.S. Corruccini. 1974b. The Relation Between Ponderal Index and Discrete Traits and Measurements of the Skull. Human Biology 46:219-231.
- R.S. Corruccini. 1974c. Calvarial Shape Relationships between Fossil Hominids. Yearbook of Physical Anthropology 18:89-109.
- R.S. Corruccini. 1975a. Metrical Analysis of Fontechevade II. American Journal of Physical Anthropology 42:95-97.
- R.S. Corruccini. 1975b. Multivariate Analysis of Gigantopithecus Mandibles. American Journal of Physical Anthropology 42:167-170.
- R.S. Corruccini. 1975c. Multivariate Analysis in Biological Anthropology: Some Considerations. Journal of Human Evolution 4:1-19.
- H.M. McHenry, R.S. Corruccini. 1975d. Distal Humerus in Hominoid Evolution. Folia Primatologica 23:227-244.
- R.L. Ciochon, R.S. Corruccini. 1975e. Morphometric Analysis of Platyrrhine Femora with Taxonomic Implications and Notes on Two Fossil Forms. Journal of Human Evolution 4:193-217.
- H.M. McHenry, R.S. Corruccini. 1975f. Multivariate Analysis of Early Hominid Pelvic Bones. American Journal of Physical Anthropology 43:263-270.
