= Peninj Mandible =

Hominin fossil

- Catalog no.: Peninj 1
- Common name: Peninj Mandible
- Species: Australopithecus boisei
- Age: 1.5 mya
- Place discovered: Peninj, Tanzania
- Date discovered: 1964
- Discovered by: Kamoya Kimeu, Richard Leakey

The Peninj Mandible (Peninj 1), also called Natron mandible, is the fossilized lower jaw and teeth of an australopithecine specimen, likely that of Paranthropus boisei or a similar population. It was discovered in West Lake Natron, in Ngorongoro District of Arusha Region of Tanzania by Kamoya Kimeu, Glynn Isaac, and Richard Leakey in 1964.

This mandible (jaw) is estimated to be 1.5 million years old and it is characterized as having a robust build with large molars and reduced incisors. The specimen is believed to be an adult male.

== Discovery ==
Peninj 1 was found in 1964 at a site in Tanzania called Peninj, west of Lake Natron and about 80 km (50 miles) from Olduvai Gorge, a major paleoanthropological site. On 11 January, fossil hunter Kamoya Kimeu was crossing the western side of Lake Natron as part of a team led by Richard Leakey when he discovered the mandible buried in ancient volcanic ash in situ. Later that year, Louis Leakey, his wife Mary Leakey and their son Richard, announced the discovery of the Peninj Mandible in an article published in Nature.

Together with the OH 5 cranium, the nearly complete mandible of Peninj 1 showed that this East African species was even more robust than other hominin specimens found in southern Africa.

== See also ==
- List of human evolution fossils
