= Making Waves =

Making Waves may refer to:

== Film and television ==
- Making Waves (TV series), a British television drama series
- Making Waves: The Art of Cinematic Sound, 2019 documentary film about sound design in film

== Music ==
- Making Waves (The Nolans album), 1980 album by The Nolans
- "Making Waves", a song by Status Quo from the album Under the Influence

== Other uses ==
- Making Waves (fanzine), a four-issue feminist punk zine published from 2011.
- Making Waves (software)
- Making Waves Canada, former name of SWAM Canada, organisation that teaches swimming
- Making Waves: Irving Dardik and His Superwave Principle, a biography about Irving Dardik
