= Kamoyapithecus =

Kamoyapithecus Temporal range: 27.5–24.2 Million years ago

Scientific classification
- Kingdom: Animalia
- Phylum: Chordata
- Class: Mammalia
- Order: Primates
- Parvorder: Catarrhini
- Family: incertae sedis
- Genus: †Kamoyapithecus; M.G. Leakey et al., 1995

Type species
- †Kamoyapithecus hamiltoni Madden, 1980

Species of fossil primate

Kamoyapithecus ('Kamoya' + Greek -pithekos “ape”) was a primate that lived in Africa during the late Oligocene period, about 27.5-24.2 million years ago. First found in 1948 as part of a University of California, Berkeley expedition, it was at first thought to be under a form of Proconsul by C.T. Madden in 1980, but after a re-examination by Meave Leakey and associates later, the fossils were moved under a new genus Kamoyapithecus, named after the renowned fossil finder Kamoya Kimeu. The genus is represented by only one species, K. hamiltoni.

== Morphology ==
Kamoyapithecus is known exclusively by its teeth and jaws. The type specimen, KNM-LS 7, was a right maxillary jaw fragment found during the expedition in 1948. Through this fossil as well as more recent fragments of mandibles and teeth, it has been found that Kamoyapithecus had very large and robust canines. The canines appear to have a distinctive tip that links Kamoyapithecus with hominoid genus Proconsul.

Its teeth also have been found through plane film X-ray to not be thickly enamelled. This suggests that Kamoyapithecus had more emphasis on foods that did not involve heavy wearing, such as soft fruits, nuts and seeds. This would have been well-placed in the Late-Oligocene in Africa, when forests covered a lot of the land.

Similar affinities with the jaw fragments have been seen with Afropithecus, Proconsul, and the Morotopithecus, but nothing definitive can be stated as to the relationship between these genera and Kamoyapithecus as the fossil material is very fragmentary.
