= Kamoya Kimeu =

Kenyan paleontologist and curator (1938–2022)

- Born: 1938; Makueni County
- Died: 20 July 2022 (aged 83–84); Nairobi
- Occupations: Paleoanthropologist, fossil hunter, curator
- Known for: Discovery of important hominid fossils including Turkana Boy
- Awards: LaGorce Medal (1985)
- Scientific career
- Fields: Paleoanthropology

Kamoya Kimeu (1938 – 20 July 2022) was a Kenyan paleontologist and curator, whose contributions to the field of paleoanthropology were recognised with the National Geographic Society's LaGorce Medal and with an honorary doctorate of science degree from Case Western Reserve University.

== Early life and education ==
Kamoya Kimeu was born in 1938 in Makueni County, a rural area of southern Kenya, to Philomena Mwelu and Kimeu Mbalu. His father was a goat herder, but at the time of Kamoya's birth, was away working on a railroad construction project.

Young Kamoya Kimeu attended a Christian missionary school for six years, but left once he was old enough to herd the family goats in the field. The native language of his family was Kikamba. He also learned to speak English and Swahili, which proved invaluable in later life, when he translated for visiting scientists with whom he worked.

== Career ==
Kimeu began to work in paleoanthropology as a laborer for Louis Leakey and Mary Leakey in the 1950s. During his job interview, Louis Leakey spoke with him in fluent Kikuyu, a similar language to Kikamba, which encouraged Kimeu to work with the team.

In 1963, he joined the expeditions led by Richard Leakey, the son of Mary and Louis who followed in their footsteps as a paleoanthropologist. Kimeu accompanied him to the Omo River and Lake Rudolf (now Lake Turkana) in 1967. He quickly became Richard Leakey's right-hand man, assuming control of field operations in Leakey's absence. He was known by colleagues as, Mr. Kamoya. In 1977, he became the National Museums of Kenya's curator for all prehistoric sites in Kenya.

Significant fossil discoveries by Kimeu include a Homo habilis skull known as KNM-ER 1813, an almost complete Homo ergaster skeleton known as KNM-WT 15000 or Turkana Boy (also known as Nariokotome boy), and in 1964, the jaw of a Paranthropus boisei hominid that is known as the Peninj Mandible. Kimeu was described as “a legend...responsible for some of the most significant fossil finds that shaped our understanding of our evolutionary past” by Carol Ward, a professor of anatomy at the University of Missouri.

== Personal life ==
Kimeu died from kidney failure on 20 July 2022 in Nairobi, Kenya. He believed his age to be approximately 84.

== Eponyms ==
Kimeu has two fossil primates named after him: Kamoyapithecus hamiltoni and Cercopithecoides kimeui.

== Awards ==
- Kimeu was presented with the National Geographic Society's LaGorce Medal by the U.S. President Ronald Reagan in a ceremony at the White House in 1985.
- He was awarded an honorary doctorate of science degree from Case Western Reserve University in 2021.

== See also ==
- List of fossil sites (with link directory)
- List of hominina (hominid) fossils (with images)
