= WildlifeDirect =

Kenya and US registered charitable organisation

WildlifeDirect Inc
- Founded: 1 June 2006
- Founder: Richard Leakey
- Purpose: Conservation
- Location: Nairobi, Kenya
- Region served: Worldwide
- Method: Awareness, Fund raising, blogging
- Key people: Richard Leakey; Harold Wackman; Paula Kahumbu
- Website: wildlifedirect.org

WildlifeDirect is a Kenya and US registered charitable organisation founded by African conservationist Richard Leakey. Its main office is located in Nairobi, Kenya.

WildlifeDirect was established in 2006 to provide support to conservationists in Africa directly on the ground via the use of blogs, which enables anybody, anywhere to play a direct and interactive role in the survival of some of the world's most precious species.

WildlifeDirect takes no administration fee for the funds that are transferred through their website so that the financial support can go to where it was intended in its entirety. Their core costs are provided for separately through grants, primarily from the European Union.

The current CEO is Paula Kahumbu, recipient of the 2021 Rolex Award from the National Geographic Society.

== Work ==
Mountain gorillas

In January 2007, Congo Rangers in charge of gorilla protection from Virunga National Park reported through their blogs with WildlifeDirect that one solitary male, silverback mountain gorilla had been killed and butchered. A week later, WildlifeDirect reported the death of another male mountain gorilla, later identified as Karema, in the same area. His remains, principally his head, had been dumped in a pit latrine.

WildlifeDirect's intervention in the gorillas deaths led to a deal between Congo Rangers and the rebels on the Democratic Republic of Congo side of Virunga National Park, where, despite ceasefire agreements, areas are still controlled by rebel fighters loyal to renegade Congolese army general Laurent Nkunda.

After worldwide publicity about the deaths of the gorillas was generated by WildlifeDirect and the Frankfurt Zoological Society, which works with the charity in the area, the rebel movement issued a press release denying any involvement.

Hippos

In December 2006, The Advanced Force of the Congo Rangers reported on their WildlifeDirect blog that Mai Mai rebels shot several hundred hippos on the south-western shore of Lake Edward in Virunga National Park, halving an already decimated population. Less than two decades ago, conservationists counted 22,875 hippos in the park, most of them in and around the lake. But an aerial count following the massacre showed that what was once the world's most important hippo stock had been reduced to 315 animals.

Only one significant group of Hippos now remains in Virunga National Park, in Ishango on the Northern shore of Lake Edward. To help secure the safety of these animals, WildlifeDirect set up a blog for Atamato Madrandele, the Park Ranger responsible for the Ishango Sector.

Lions

In Kenya, for Masaai youth to join the ranks of morans, the initiated young men have to kill a lion, either as a group or individually. This in turn does no justice to the lion populations near where the Masaai live. The Lion Guardians project started in 2006 in response to the slaughtering of lions in 2001 and works by getting the Masaai morans to protect these lions instead of killing them. These morans are employed and tasked with tracking, monitoring and conserving the lions. The Lion Guardian project won the $100,000 St Andrews Prize for the Environment in 2012.

Since the start of the project, there have very few cases of lion spearing and killings where the project has been rolled out, and the Lion Guardians have been documenting their work on their blog.
