= Wildlife Wars =

Book by Richard Leakey and Virginia Morell

Wildlife Wars: My Fight to Save Africa's Natural Treasures is a book written by Richard Leakey and Virginia Morell. It was published in 2001 by St. Martin's Press.

== Overview ==
It tells of how Leakey had been director of National Museum when appointed in 1989, President Daniel arap Moi appointed him to run the Kenya Wildlife Service. This was an entirely new experience to Leakey, because he had been accustomed to studying hominids, not managing wildlife. Elephant poaching had been a major problem in the Kenyan National Parks, and the book tells of his efforts to stop it, sometimes with a danger to his life.

== Reception ==
The book was reviewed in the journal Endangered Species, the ALA magazine Booklist, Publishers Weekly, Books in Canada, African Business, the Royal Geographical Society's Geographical magazine.

== Editions ==
- Wildlife Wars: My Fight to Save Africa's Natural Treasures ISBN 0-330-37240-8
