= Making Waves: Irving Dardik and His Superwave Principle =

Book by Roger Lewin

Making Waves
- Author: Roger Lewin
- Language: English
- Genre: Nonfiction
- Publisher: Rodale Books
- Publication date: 25 September 2005
- Publication place: United States
- Media type: Print (hardcover)
- Pages: 256
- ISBN: 978-1-59486-044-7

Making Waves: Irving Dardik and His Superwave Principle is a biography of Irving Dardik and his controversial SuperWave principle, which posits the use of wave technology as a viable method of treating diseases. It was written by science writer Roger Lewin and published by Rodale Books in 2005.
