= Roger Lewin =

British author

Roger Lewin (born 1944) is a British prize-winning science writer and author of 20 books.

== Career ==
Lewin was a staff member of New Scientist in London for nine years. He went to Washington, D.C. to write for Science for ten years as News Editor. An example article was "Evolutionary Theory Under Fire", 21, November 1980, vol. 210, pp 883–887. Lewin wrote three books with Richard Leakey. He became a full-time freelance writer in 1989 and concentrated on writing books. In 1989 Roger Lewin won the Royal Society Prizes for Science Books for Bones of Contention.

In 2000, Lewin formed Harvest Associates with wife Birute Regine for business consulting. Together they wrote, The Soul at Work: Unleashing the Power of Complexity Science for Business Success, Orion Business Books (1999), republished as Weaving Complexity & Business: Engaging the Soul at Work, Texere (2000). He is a member of the Complexity Research Group at the London School of Economics.

Lewin has two adult sons living in England.

== Bibliography ==
- Hormones – Chemical Communicators, 1972.
- The Nervous System, 1974
- Origins, co-authored with Richard Leakey, 1977.
- Lewin, R. (25 May 1984), "Man the Scavenger", Science, 224 (4651): 861–862, Bibcode:1984Sci...224..861L, doi:10.1126/science.224.4651.861, PMID 17743189
- Thread of Life – The Smithsonian Looks at Evolution, 1982 hardcover, 1991 paperback.
- In the Age of Mankind – A Smithsonian Book of Human Evolution, 1988 hardcover.
- People of the Lake: Mankind & Its Beginnings, by Leakey and Lewin, 1988 paperback
- Origins Reconsidered: In Search of What Makes Us Human, with Richard Leakey, 1993.
- Complexity, Life at the Edge of Chaos, 1992 hardcover.
- Kanzi: The Ape at the Brink of the Human Mind, with Sue Savage-Rumbaugh, 1996 paperback.
- Making Waves: Irving Dardik and His Superwave Principle, 2005, Rodale Books.
- The Sixth Extinction: Patterns of Life and the Future of Humankind, with Richard Leakey, 1996 (paperback).
- Bones of Contention: Controversies in the Search for Human Origins, 1987, second edition 1997, ISBN 0226476510. Danny Yee review: Accounts of several of the most notable controversies in paleoanthropology in the past century: Raymond Dart and Australopithecus; the Piltdown Man forgery; the Ramaphithecus affair; and more. Won the 1989 Royal Society prize for science books.
- Human Evolution: An Illustrated Introduction, 1999 (4th Edition), 2005 (5th Edition).
- Patterns in Evolution: The New Molecular View, 1999 paperback.
- The Soul at Work: Embracing Complexity Science for Business, with Birute Regine, 2000 hardcover.
- Complexity, 2001 paperback.
- Weaving Complexity and Business: Engaging the Soul at Work by Lewin and Birute Regine, May 2001 paperback, renamed version of the 2000 book.
- Java Man by Carl Swisher, Garniss Curtis, and Lewin, 2002 paperback.
- Principles of Human Evolution, by Lewin and Robert A. Foley, 2003 paperback.
- Birute Regine, Roger Lewin (2003). "Third possibility leaders: the invisible edge women have in complex organizations". The Learning Organization. 10 (6): 347–352. doi:10.1108/09696470310497186. ISSN 0969-6474.
