= Virginia Morell =

American science journalist and author

Virginia Morell (born 1949) is an American science writer. She is the author of several books, and is a contributor to National Geographic and Science, among other publications.

== Early life and education ==
Morell was born in 1949. She attended Pomona College, graduating in 1971. She specializes in animal behavior, cognition and conservation. Morrell resides in Oregon with her husband Michael McRae.

== Career ==
Morell's book Ancestral Passions, a biography about the Leakey family, was positively reviewed as a scholarly work.

Morrell authored Animal Wise: The Thoughts and Emotions of Our Fellow Creatures, which was named by Kirkus Reviews as one of the Best Books of 2013 on Nature and the Environment. The book documents research on animal cognition that reveals the mental and emotional lives of animals including ants, dogs, elephants, fish and parrots. Liza Gross who reviewed the book for KQED commented that "Morell obliterates the lines that might separate us from the rest of the animal kingdom by relating trailblazing discoveries of the emotional and intellectual lives of animals. In the process, she challenges us to rethink our ethical obligations to the creatures who share our world." It was a New York Times Bestseller.

== Selected publications ==
=== Books ===
- Ancestral Passions: The Leakey Family and the Quest for Humankind's Beginnings (1995)
- Blue Nile: Ethiopia's River of Magic and Mystery (2001)
- Wildlife Wars: My Fight to Save Africa's Natural Treasures (2001: co-authored with Richard Leakey)
- Inside Animal Minds: The New Science of Animal Intelligence (2012)
- Animal Wise: The Thoughts and Emotions of Our Fellow Creatures (2013)
- Becoming a Marine Biologist (2019) (Note: "Becoming a Marine Biologist". publishersweekly.com. Retrieved 2 April 2022.)

=== Articles ===
- "The killer cat virus that doesn't kill cats". Discover. 16 (7): 62–69. July 1995.

———————
