= Noel T. Boaz =

American scientist

Noel Thomas Boaz
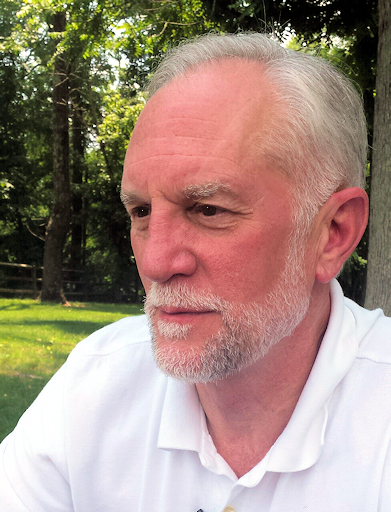
- Born: 8 February 1952 (age 74); Martinsville, Va USA
- Education: Phillips Exeter Academy 1970 University of Virginia BA 1973 University of California-Berkeley PhD 1977 Saba University School of Medicine, M.D. 2004
- Known for: Founder, Virginia Museum of Natural History Editor, Physical Anthropology News 1993–1997 President, International Foundation for Human Evolutionary Research Founder, Integrative Centers for Science and Medicine
- Awards: Rolex Awards for Enterprise, Hon. Ment. Fulbright Senior Research Fellowship

Noel Thomas Boaz (born 8 February 1952) is an American biological anthropologist, author, educator, physician, and founder of the Virginia Museum of Natural History. In addition he is founder of the Integrative Centers for Science and Medicine and the International Institute for Human Evolutionary Research.

== Background ==
Boaz was born in Martinsville, Virginia, the son of Thalma Noel Boaz and Elena More Taylor. He is the great-grandson of the Reverend Alfred William Anson, who was born at Windsor Castle and educated at Oxford University.

== Education and career ==
Boaz studied at Phillips Exeter Academy, The University of Virginia (BA), University of California-Berkeley (MA 1974, PhD 1977), and Saba University School of Medicine (M.D. 2004). He served as lecturer in anthropology at UCLA in 1977–78, and assistant professor of anthropology and anatomy at NYU in 1978–83. He is the founder of the Virginia Museum of Natural History, serving as director and curator. At Ross University he served as professor of anatomy and director of research development for the School of Medicine.

His field work includes director of the Semliki Research Expedition in the Democratic Republic of the Congo, and the Western Rift Research Expedition in Uganda. Sections of the book Camping With the Prince by Thomas Bass, describe much of the experience.

Boaz also served as director of the International Sahabi Research Project in Libya, and director of the East Libya Neogene Research Project, an international group of scientists that has searched for fossils in north-central Libya since 1979. He was a professor of anatomy and the head of medical education at the Libyan International Medical University in Benghazi. He was in Benghazi, but escaped amidst the 2011 Libyan Civil War. He also served as a forensic anthropologist for Physicians for Human Rights investigating alleged ethnic cleansing during the 1991–1995 Bosnian War. In 2002, he completed his work on the Paleoanthropology of Zhoukoudian and Dragon Bone Hill, China. He is the director of the Integrative Centers for Science and Medicine, currently developing a new school of medicine in Virginia.

== Works ==
- Evolving Health: The Origins of Illness and How the Modern World Is Making Us Sick by Noel T. Boaz (ISBN 0-471-35261-6)
- Quarry: Closing In On the Missing Link by Noel T. Boaz (ISBN 0-684-86378-2)
- Biological Anthropology: A Synthetic Approach to Human Evolution Noel T. Boaz and Alan J. Almquist(ISBN 0-13-090819-3)
- Eco Homo: How the Human Being Emerged from the Cataclysmic History of the Earth Noel T. Boaz (ISBN 0-465-01803-3)
- Essentials of Biological Anthropology Noel T. Boaz and Alan J. Almquist (ISBN 0-13-080793-1)
- Dragon Bone Hill: An Ice-Age Saga of Homo erectus Noel T. Boaz and Russell L. Ciochon (ISBN 0-19-515291-3)
- Evolution of Environments and Hominidae in the African Western Rift Valley Noel T. Boaz (ISBN 0-9625801-0-4)
- The Scavenging of Peking Man Noel T. Boaz, Russell L. Ciochon and Susan Elizabeth Hough (ASIN B003GUCE0K)
