= 2023 Demise Honours =

British government recognitions

An Honours List on The Demise of Her Majesty Queen Elizabeth II, known as the Demise Honours, was released on 25 March 2023, following the death of Elizabeth II in 2022. It made appointments and promotions within the Royal Victorian Order and of the Royal Victorian Medal. Recipients included civilians and military personnel who were involved in the state funeral of Elizabeth II, as well as former members of her household.

== Knights Grand Cross of the Royal Victorian Order (GCVO) ==
- The Most Honourable David George Philip Cholmondeley, The Marquess of Cholmondeley, KCVO, lately Lord Great Chamberlain, Royal Household
- The Right Honourable James Hubert Ramsay, The Earl of Dalhousie, lately Lord Steward, Royal Household

== Dames Commander of the Royal Victorian Order (DCVO) ==
- Helen Andrea Louise Cross, CVO, lately Diary Secretary to Her Majesty Queen Elizabeth II
- Philippa de Pass, CVO, lately Lady in Waiting to Her Majesty Queen Elizabeth II
- Jennifer Susan Gordon Lennox, CVO, lately Lady in Waiting to Her Majesty Queen Elizabeth II

== Commanders of the Royal Victorian Order (CVO) ==
- Sarah Davina Clarke, OBE, Lady Usher of the Black Rod, for services to the Lying-in-State of Her Majesty Queen Elizabeth II
- Lucy Clare D'Orsi, QPM, Chief Constable, British Transport Police, for services to the Lying-in-State of Her Majesty Queen Elizabeth II
- Mary Angela Kelly, LVO, Personal Assistant, Advisor and Curator to Her Majesty Queen Elizabeth II
- Simon Nicholas Henry Hayward Knapp, LVO, Veterinary Surgeon, Royal Mews
- The Reverend Canon Joseph John Morrow, CBE, Lord Lyon King of Arms, for services on the Demise of Her Majesty Queen Elizabeth II
- Terence Alan Pendry, LVO BEM, lately Stud Groom and Manager, Royal Mews, Windsor Castle
- Paul Kevin Whybrew, LVO RVM, Page to Her Majesty Queen Elizabeth II

== Lieutenants of the Royal Victorian Order (LVO) ==
- Ellen Atkinson, Director, Cabinet Office, for services to the State Funeral of Her Majesty Queen Elizabeth II
- Jane Sophie Connors, QPM, Deputy Assistant Commissioner, Metropolitan Police, for services to the State Funeral of Her Majesty Queen Elizabeth II
- Alexander Garty, MVO, for transport services in Scotland on the Demise of Her Majesty Queen Elizabeth II
- David Hardcastle, MVO, Operations Lead, Royal Household, for the State Funeral of Her Majesty Queen Elizabeth II
- James Stephen Hynd, Head of Cabinet, Scottish Government, for services on the Demise of Her Majesty Queen Elizabeth II
- Commodore Catherine Jordan, Royal Navy, State Field Gun Carriage, The State Funeral of Her Majesty Queen Elizabeth II
- Peter William Lee, Director, Cabinet Office, for services to the State Funeral of Her Majesty Queen Elizabeth II
- The Lady Elizabeth Mary Cecilia Leeming, lately Lady in Waiting to Her Majesty Queen Elizabeth II
- Carol Margaret McCall, OBE, Head of Civil Contingency Communications, Cabinet Office, for services to the State Funeral of Her Majesty Queen Elizabeth II
- Barry John Mitford, MVO RVM, Page to Her Majesty Queen Elizabeth II
- Susan Willa Rhodes, lately Lady in Waiting to Her Majesty Queen Elizabeth II
- Clare Louise Sloan, deputy director, External Relations, Northern Ireland Office, for services on the Demise of Her Majesty Queen Elizabeth II

== Members of the Royal Victorian Order (MVO) ==
- Lieutenant Commander Jason Allen, Royal Navy, State Field Gun Carriage, the State Funeral of Her Majesty Queen Elizabeth II
- John McDonald Andrew, Chief Steward, St Giles' Cathedral, Edinburgh, for services to the Lying-at-Rest of Her Majesty Queen Elizabeth II
- Trevor Andrews, OBE, Joint Head of Conferences and Events, Foreign, Commonwealth and Development Office, for services to the State Funeral of Her Majesty Queen Elizabeth II
- Lieutenant Colonel David Andrew Barringer, MBE, Royal Corps of Army Music, Army Director of Music, the State Funeral of Her Majesty Queen Elizabeth II.
- David William Beck, QPM, Superintendent, Police Service of Northern Ireland, for services on the Demise of Her Majesty Queen Elizabeth II
- Flight Lieutenant Stephen Frank Bethell, Royal Air Force, Air Crew for the move of Her Majesty Queen Elizabeth II
- The Reverend Mark Russell Birch, Precentor, Westminster Abbey, for services to the State Funeral of Her Majesty Queen Elizabeth II
- Lieutenant William James Bird, The Royal Regiment of Scotland, Bearer Party, Lying-at-Rest in St. Giles' Cathedral, Edinburgh
- Lieutenant Commander Michael Bray, Royal Navy, State Field Gun Carriage, the State Funeral of Her Majesty Queen Elizabeth II
- Elizabeth Sarah Briant, for services to Her Majesty Queen Elizabeth II's ponies
- Lieutenant Colonel Jason Burcham, Royal Marines, Royal Marines Principal Director of Music, the State Funeral of Her Majesty Queen Elizabeth II
- Thomas Joseph Callagher, Head of Strategy and Protocol Team, Cabinet Office, for services to the State Funeral of Her Majesty Queen Elizabeth II
- Warrant Officer Class 2 Gareth William Chambers, Irish Guards, Army Drum Major, the State Funeral of Her Majesty Queen Elizabeth II
- Major Andrew Roger Chatburn, Assistant Comptroller, Lord Chamberlain's Office, Royal Household
- Captain Amy Victoria Cooper, King's Troop, Royal Horse Artillery, State Gun Carriage, the State Funeral of Her Majesty Queen Elizabeth II
- Warrant Officer Class 2 Scott James Heron Cox, The Royal Regiment of Scotland, Bearer Party, Lying-at-Rest in St. Giles' Cathedral, Edinburgh
- Commander Nicola Cripps, Royal Navy, State Field Gun Carriage, the State Funeral of Her Majesty Queen Elizabeth II
- Stewart Ian Drummond, Superintendent, Police Service of Scotland, for services on the Demise of Her Majesty Queen Elizabeth II
- Commander Stephen Elliot, Royal Navy, State Field Gun Carriage, the State Funeral of Her Majesty Queen Elizabeth II
- Wing Commander William Richard Skeen Essex, Royal Air Force, Air Crew for the move of Her Majesty Queen Elizabeth II
- Major Paul Anthony Fagin, Army Reserve, Staff Officer 2, G5 Ceremonials HQ LONDIST
- Ruth Barbara Fiddis, Visits and Events Manager, Northern Ireland Office, for services on the Demise of Her Majesty Queen Elizabeth II
- Captain Iain Alexander Forat, Scots Guards, Ceremonial Drill Instructor, the State Funeral of Her Majesty Queen Elizabeth II
- Warrant Officer Class 1 Anthony Carl Gibson, Scots Guards, Garrison Sergeant Major, Edinburgh Garrison, Lying-at-Rest in St. Giles' Cathedral, Edinburgh
- Master Aircrew Mark Hamer, Royal Air Force, Air Crew for the move of Her Majesty Queen Elizabeth II
- Lieutenant Commander Richard Hanks, Royal Navy, State Field Gun Carriage, the State Funeral of Her Majesty Queen Elizabeth II
- Lieutenant Richard Frederick Michael Hobbs, Grenadier Guards, Bearer Party, the State Funeral of Her Majesty Queen Elizabeth II
- Flying Officer James Michael Stewart Hudson, Royal Air Force, Air Bearer Party for Her Majesty Queen Elizabeth II.
- Katherine Anne Jerram, for services to Her Majesty Queen Elizabeth II's horses
- Warrant Officer Class 2 Dean Andrew Jones, Grenadier Guards, Bearer Party, the State Funeral of Her Majesty Queen Elizabeth II
- Warrant Officer Class 2 Christopher Clive Mace, Royal Marines, Corps Drum Major Royal Marines, the State Funeral of Her Majesty Queen Elizabeth II
- Warrant Officer David John Martin, Royal Air Force, Air Bearer Party for Her Majesty Queen Elizabeth II
- Flight Lieutenant Grant Richard Mauldon, Royal Air Force, Air Crew for the move of Her Majesty Queen Elizabeth II
- Flight Lieutenant Andrew James McDowell, Royal Air Force, Air Crew for the move of Her Majesty Queen Elizabeth II
- Master Aircrew Kenneth Scott Mitchell, Royal Air Force, Air Crew for the move of Her Majesty Queen Elizabeth II
- Wing Commander Piers Lawrence Morrell, OBE, Royal Air Force, Royal Air Force Director of Music, the State Funeral of Her Majesty Queen Elizabeth II
- Acting Warrant Officer William Paul Phelan, Royal Air Force, Royal Air Force Drum Major, the State Funeral of Her Majesty Queen Elizabeth II
- Nicholas Paul Reuter, Acting Inspector, Thames Valley Police, Joint Lead Planner, Thames Valley Police, for services to the State Funeral of Her Majesty Queen Elizabeth II
- Lorraine Rossdale, Head of Event Management, Westminster Abbey, for services to the State Funeral of Her Majesty Queen Elizabeth II.
- Hazel Scott, Private Secretary to the Lady Usher of the Black Rod, for services to the Lying-in-State of Her Majesty Queen Elizabeth II
- Barry Lyndon Jacob Shrubb, RVM, Deputy Head Chauffeur, Royal Mews
- Warrant Officer Class 1 Benjamin Gary Townley, Scots Guards, Ceremonial Drill Instructor, the State Funeral of Her Majesty Queen Elizabeth II
- Iona Wyn Turner, Head of External Communications, Welsh Government, for services on the Demise of Her Majesty Queen Elizabeth II
- Warrant Officer Class 1 Warfare Specialist (Abovewater Warfare Weapons) Darren Wearing, MBE, Royal Navy, State Field Gun Carriage, the State Funeral of Her Majesty Queen Elizabeth II
- Vivienne Ann Weaver (Vivienne Johnson), Ceremonial Team Leader, Department for Digital, Culture Media and Sport, for services to the State Funeral of Her Majesty Queen Elizabeth II

== Royal Victorian Medal (Silver) ==
- Air Specialist Craig Lorcan Andeson, Royal Air Force
- Guardsman Jared Kent Bailey, Grenadier Guards
- Able Seaman Ross Barker, Royal Navy
- Leading Naval Nurse Russell Beardsall, Queen Alexandra's Royal Naval Nursing Service, Royal Navy
- Engineering Technician Angus Bellamy, Royal Navy
- Able Seaman Sacha Louise Bellwood, State Field Gun Carriage
- Engineering Technician Laurynas Berenis, State Field Gun Carriage
- Able Seaman Tyler Gibson Beswick, State Field Gun Carriage
- Lance Corporal John Nicholas Blanks, Royal Air Force
- Engineering Technician Sam Harley Booth, Royal Navy, State Field Gun Carriage
- Able Seaman Michael James Bowley, State Field Gun Carriage
- Able Seaman Joshua Connor Stephen Norman Brace, State Field Gun Carriage
- Able Seaman David John Brennan, State Field Gun Carriage
- Able Seaman Shaunna Tina Eve Broderick, State Field Gun Carriage
- Engineering Technician Harry Stephen Brookman, State Field Gun Carriage
- Able Seaman Alexander Wynter Burbury, State Field Gun Carriage
- Leading Air Engineering Technician Joseph Edward Burton, State Field Gun Carriage
- Engineering Technician Kieron Lee Caldwell, State Field Gun Carriage
- Leading Air Engineering Technician Colin Martin Campell, State Field Gun Carriage
- Able Seaman Elizabeth Grace Carberry, State Field Gun Carriage
- Leading Engineering Technician Dean Thomas Carns, State Field Gun Carriage
- Martin Paul Castledine, Dean's Verger, Westminster Abbey
- Naval Airman Thomas James Clements, State Field Gun Carriage
- Leading Logistician Michael Coleman, State Field Gun Carriage
- Chief Technician Stuart Peter Collins, Royal Air Force
- Naval Airman Oakley Cooper, State Field Gun Carriage
- Guardsman Fletcher Harry Cox, Grenadier Guards
- Able Seaman Cameron John Crawford, State Field Gun Carriage
- Engineering Technician Jay Paul Crawford, State Field Gun Carriage
- Able Seaman Jack Crompton, State Field Gun Carriage
- Air Engineering Technician Jack Christopher Cross, State Field Gun Carriage
- Engineering Technician Kyle Paul Robert Cuthbertson, State Field Gun Carriage
- Able Seaman Oliver George Dabis, State Field Gun Carriage
- Able Seaman Thomas Oliver Day, State Field Gun Carriage
- Engineering Technician Owen Elliot Deakin, State Field Gun Carriage
- Engineering Technician Dylan McKenzie Dugdale, State Field Gun Carriage
- Leading Engineering Technician David Eastcroft, State Field Gun Carriage
- Leading Air Engineering Technician Alexander Howard Fulton Edge, State Field Gun Carriage
- Leading Air Engineering Technician Molly Rose Ellis, State Field Gun Carriage
- Able Seaman Toby David Evans, State Field Gun Carriage
- Leading Engineering Technician Abubakar Farooq, State Field Gun Carriage
- Andrew Richard Fitzgerald, Head Chauffeur, Royal Household
- Guardsman Wayne Anthony Flint, Grenadier Guards
- Lance Corporal Tony John Flynn, Grenadier Guards
- Private Lyle Vincent Foot, The Royal Regiment of Scotland
- Engineering Technician Connor William James Forgan, State Field Gun Carriage
- Air Engineering Technician Benjamin Thomas Forrest, State Field Gun Carriage
- Jonathan Foulkes, Chauffeur, Royal Household
- Able Seaman Levi Derek Gilmore, State Field Gun Carriage
- Lance Corporal Stuart Grant, Royal Air Force
- Able Seaman Thomas Grant, State Field Gun Carriage
- Guardsman Robert David Gray, Grenadier Guards
- Able Seaman Declan James Green, State Field Gun Carriage
- Lance Sergeant Ryan Ronald Griffiths, Grenadier Guards
- Engineering Technician Scott Gregory Stuart Groat, State Field Gun Carriage
- Leading Air Engineering Technician Adam George Guy, State Field Gun Carriage
- Able Seaman William Ian Alan Halliwell, State Field Gun Carriage
- Engineering Technician Josh Harrison, State Field Gun Carriage
- Able Seaman Hattie Mae Haycock, State Field Gun Carriage
- Leading Air Engineering Technician James Marc Hayes, State Field Gun Carriage
- Leading Airman Aircraft Handler Daniel Leslie Hill, State Field Gun Carriage
- Leading Air Engineering Technician Nicholas Craig Holland, State Field Gun Carriage
- Engineering Technician Toby Alan Holland, State Field Gun Carriage
- Engineering Technician Liam Hollands, State Field Gun Carriage
- Able Seaman Oscar Joseph Holt, State Field Gun Carriage
- Leading Air Engineering Technician James David House, State Field Gun Carriage
- Engineering Technician Alun Christopher Hughes, State Field Gun Carriage
- Leading Logistician Carl Stephen Hughes, State Field Gun Carriage
- Leading Air Engineering Technician Matt Iceton, State Field Gun Carriage
- Engineering Technician Adam Anthony Irvine, State Field Gun Carriage
- Able Seaman Jack Joseph James, State Field Gun Carriage
- Able Seaman Technician Gareth John Jenkins, State Field Gun Carriage
- Sergeant Thomas Frederick Jenks, King's Troop Royal Horse Artillery
- Able Seaman Jordan Michael Johnston, State Field Gun Carriage
- Able Seaman Joshua Jones, State Field Gun Carriage
- Leading Airman Samuel Jones, State Field Gun Carriage
- Engineering Technician Shanon Ann Page Jones, State Field Gun Carriage
- Able Seaman Millie Meerloo-Jones, State Field Gun Carriage
- Bombardier Tara Kelly, King's Troop Royal Horse Artillery
- Able Seaman Laurie Taylor Kidman, State Field Gun Carriage
- Sergeant Jamie Lee Kinder, Royal Air Force
- Engineering Technician Jessica Rose King, State Field Gun Carriage
- Able Seaman Tyler Reece King, State Field Gun Carriage
- Engineering Technician Charlie Lawrence Knight, State Field Gun Carriage
- Engineering Technician Joe Aaron Knight, State Field Gun Carriage
- Able Seaman Samuel Robert Knowles, State Field Gun Carriage
- Able Seaman David Antony Lawrence, State Field Gun Carriage
- Engineering Technician Ethan James Layburn, State Field Gun Carriage
- Able Seaman Adam Dennis Leigh, State Field Gun Carriage
- Leading Airman Thomas Lenszner, State Field Gun Carriage
- Engineering Technician Dael Nicholas Lett, State Field Gun Carriage
- Air Specialist Nicholas Richard Lloyd, Royal Air Force
- Able Seaman Matthew Ian Luxton, State Field Gun Carriage
- Engineering Technician Benjamin Merick MacDonald, State Field Gun Carriage
- Able Seaman Steven MacIver, State Field Gun Carriage
- Able Seaman Debra Louise Malt, State Field Gun Carriage
- Able Seaman Christopher Matthew, State Field Gun Carriage
- Private Ryan McEachran McAllister, The Royal Regiment of Scotland
- Private Cameron Robson McCabe, The Royal Regiment of Scotland
- Chief Petty Officer Samuel McGaw, State Field Gun Carriage
- Able Seaman Sam Robertson McGeary, State Field Gun Carriage
- Air Specialist James Leslie McKay, Royal Air Force
- Able Seaman Daniel McKell, State Field Gun Carriage
- Private Kian Meikle, The Royal Regiment of Scotland; Bearer Party
- Leading Warfare Specialist Darran Miles, State Field Gun Carriage
- Chief Petty Officer Warfare Specialist Timothy Mills, State Field Gun Carriage
- Engineering Technician Josh Ashe Moores, State Field Gun Carriage
- Air Specialist Connor James Morris, Royal Air Force
- Engineering Technician Leon James Morris, State Field Gun Carriage
- Engineering Technician Nicholas Morrison, State Field Gun Carriage
- Lance Bombardier Daniel Paul Morton, King's Troop Royal Horse Artillery
- Corporal Robbie William Morton, The Royal Regiment of Scotland
- Leading Air Engineering Technician Hassan Samier Nada, State Field Gun Carriage
- Leading Physical Trainer El-Leigh Anne Nevill Neale, State Field Gun Carriage
- Air Specialist Thomas Daniel Newman, Royal Air Force
- Able Seaman Eva Rose Nicholl, State Field Gun Carriage
- Engineering Technician Sebastian Mark Jefferson Nunn, State Field Gun Carriage
- Able Seaman Warfare Specialist Kiaran Sidney O’Dwyer, State Field Gun Carriage
- Air Engineering Technician Kai Officer, State Field Gun Carriage
- Able Seaman Callum Oliver, State Field Gun Carriage
- Chief Petty Officer Warfare Specialist Edward O’Malley, State Field Gun Carriage
- Sergeant Robert John O’Neil, Royal Air Force
- Lance Sergeant Elias Jake Orlowski, Grenadier Guards
- Able Seaman Jack Kenneth Osborne, State Field Gun Carriage
- Air Engineering Technician Samuel Louis Lindsey Paine, State Field Gun Carriage
- Able Seaman Warfare Specialist Benjamin William Panniers, State Field Gun Carriage
- Able Seaman Oliver Dean Parker, State Field Gun Carriage
- Guardsman James Robert Patterson, Grenadier Guards
- Engineering Technician Emerson Richard Parkinson, State Field Gun Carriage
- Guardsman James Robert Patterson, Grenadier Guards
- Able Seaman Oliver Jaques Pattinson, State Field Gun Carriage
- Engineering Technician Reece Pearson, State Field Gun Carriage
- Air Specialist Oscar Anstee-Pinnock, Royal Air Force
- Leading Engineering Technician Rizwan Qadir, State Field Gun Carriage
- Able Seaman Hollie Anne Randle, State Field Gun Carriage
- Logistician Summer Jay Rawlins, State Field Gun Carriage
- Able Seaman Guy Alan Reason, State Field Gun Carriage
- Private Ryan Robert Ritchie, The Royal Regiment of Scotland
- Engineering Technician Mason Myers- Roberts, State Field Gun Carriage
- Able Seaman Macy Robins, State Field Gun Carriage
- Able Seaman Ashley David Rosser, State Field Gun Carriage
- Leading Air Engineering Technician Adam Joshua Rowling, State Field Gun Carriage
- Guardsman David John Sanderson, Grenadier Guards
- Able Seaman Lewis James Sandford, State Field Gun Carriage
- Able Seaman Nathan Luke Searle, State Field Gun Carriage
- Able Seaman Jordan William Shepherd, State Field Gun Carriage
- Able Seaman John Duncan Sim, State Field Gun Carriage
- Guardsman Luke John Simpson, Grenadier Guards
- Private Tom Penman Sinclair, The Royal Regiment of Scotland
- Engineering Technician Harrison Thomas Smith, State Field Gun Carriage
- Leading Warfare Specialist Jake Mitchell Smith, State Field Gun Carriage
- Gunner Rosie Grace Smith, King's Troop Royal Horse Artillery
- Medical Assistant Paisley Chambers-Smith, State Field Gun Carriage
- Able Seaman George Philip South, State Field Gun Carriage
- Engineering Technician Harley Joe Stephens, State Field Gun Carriage
- Lance Corporal Jonathan Stevenson, The Royal Regiment of Scotland
- Corporal Conrad William Joseph Mepham-Stone Royal Air Force
- Engineering Technician Joshua Strang, State Field Gun Carriage
- Air Specialist Toby Robert John Stratford, Royal Air Force
- Leading Engineering Technician Alexander William Isaac Stuart, State Field Gun Carriage
- Engineering Technician Teddy Enow Tabe, State Field Gun Carriage
- Leading Survival Equipment Technician Steven Philip Taylor, State Field Gun Carriage
- Able Seaman Alfie George Tearall, State Field Gun Carriage
- Leading Engineering Technician Benjamin David Tetley, State Field Gun Carriage
- Leading Engineering Technician Ewan Alexander Thomas, State Field Gun Carriage
- Private Graeme David Thomson, The Royal Regiment of Scotland
- Able Seaman Jack Thomson, State Field Gun Carriage
- Air Engineering Technician Brandon James Thorpe, State Field Gun Carriage
- Engineering Technician Warren Jay Tobin, State Field Gun Carriage
- Private Peni Vuiyale Tubuna, The Royal Regiment of Scotland
- Lance Sergeant Alexander Turner, Grenadier Guards
- Engineering Technician Lawrence Andrew Turner, State Field Gun Carriage
- Engineering Technician Oliver John Turner, State Field Gun Carriage
- Leading Engineering Technician Robert David Turner, State Field Gun Carriage
- Engineering Technician Joseph Edward McGonagle-Turner, State Field Gun Carriage
- Leading Engineering Technician Ratu Rusiate Busanavanua Vadiga, State Field Gun Carriage
- Leading Air Engineering Technician Adam Walker, State Field Gun Carriage
- Able Seaman Samuel Alexander Ward, State Field Gun Carriage
- Engineering Technician Ryan Reggie Warren, State Field Gun Carriage
- Able Seaman Warfare Specialist Benjamin Howard Warrington, State Field Gun Carriage
- Able Seaman Warfare Specialist Calum Frank Fleming Webster, State Field Gun Carriage
- Air Engineering Technician Jeremy Peter Robert Wiggins, State Field Gun Carriage
- Engineering Technician Brandon Connor Wood, State Field Gun Carriage
- Engineering Technician Nathan Woods, State Field Gun Carriage
