= Septimus Robinson =

Lieutenant-Colonel Sir Septimus Robinson (30 January 1710 – 6 September 1765) was a British Army officer who became Gentleman Usher of the Black Rod.

== Career ==
Educated at Westminster School and Christ Church, Oxford, Robinson joined the French Army in 1731 and fought in Flanders. He later fought for the British Army during the Jacobite Rising of 1745 and subsequently in Flanders under Generals Wade and Ligonier. He retired from the Army in 1754 and served as Governor to the brothers of King George III before becoming Gentleman Usher of the Black Rod. He was knighted on 10 April 1761.

He is buried at Rokeby Park in County Durham.

Government offices
Preceded by Sir Henry Bellenden	Black Rod; 1760–1765	Succeeded by Sir Francis Molyneux
