= Catherine Jordan =

Royal Navy Commodore (born 1974)

Commodore Catherine Jordan LVO
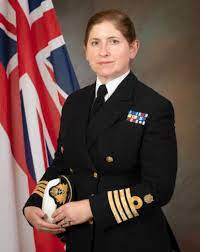
- Catherine Jordan when she was a Captain
- Born: October 1974 (age 51); County Durham, England
- Branch: Royal Navy
- Service years: 1993–2026
- Rank: Commodore
- Commands: HMS Severn; HMS Clyde; HMS St Albans; Aviation Chief of Staff, Carrier Strike & Aviation Division; HMS Collingwood
- Awards: Lieutenant of the Royal Victorian Order
- Spouses: Commodore Andy Jordan, ADC
- Children: 3

Commodore Catherine Jordan, LVO (born October 1974) is a retired senior Royal Navy officer who last served as Head of the Royal Navy Culture Centre.

In 2002 she became the first female Flight Commander in the Royal Navy and in 2022 she was one of the four captains involved in the first time women had been in command of all four of the Royal Navy's training establishments.

Also in 2022, she led the Royal Navy State Funeral Gun Carriage during the state funeral of Queen Elizabeth II. For this she was appointed a Lieutenant of the Royal Victorian Order.

== Early life ==
Jordan was born in October 1974 and grew up in Easington, County Durham. She received her education at Wellfield Community School in the nearby town of Wingate and Gordonstoun School, an independent school in Moray, Scotland. She became interested in the Royal Navy as a teenager.

== Naval career ==
Jordan joined HMS Dartmouth, also known as the Britannia Royal Naval College, in September 1993 as a University Cadet Aviator, being sponsored to study for a law degree at the University of Manchester. She completed initial fleet training on the ships HMS Broadsword, Brave and Northumberland and, after passing out from Dartmouth, she began her law degree, graduating in 1997. She was selected for training on the Westland Lynx, qualifying on both the Lynx Mk.3 and Mk.8 as a Flight Observer under the Fleet Air Arm, an individual responsible for the navigation, communications systems and weaponry of a helicopter.

She performed two tours in the Mediterranean as part of NATO counterterrorism operations and was later appointed as the first female flight commander in the Royal Navy and the first flight commander of the newly commissioned Type 23 frigate HMS St Albans in 2002. In the build-up to the Iraq War in 2003, she regenerated and commanded Gibraltar Flight from RAF Gibraltar, performing maritime security operations in the Mediterranean due to the increased terror threat for 3 months before returning to HMS St Albans, where she completed a deployment in the Middle East under Operation Calash.

After initial staff officer training, Jordan attended the Principal Warfare Officer course, which she graduated from in 2005 as top student of the year, being promoted to lieutenant commander. She then completed three short tours, first as the operations officer for gunnery and surface warfare on HMS Iron Duke, with which she took part in deployments to the Arctic Circle and the Caribbean. Next she served with Combined Task Force 158 in Iraq, with her third tour being as Operations Officer on HMS Albion.

In 2007 Jordan joined the Fleet Battle Staff, in which she spent the next six months as the staff operations officer to the commander of the task force in the Persian Gulf, the task force responsible for the protection of Iraqi oil platforms.

=== Sea commands and Fleet Air Arm ===
After her selection for Sea Command, Jordan took command of HMS Severn, a River-class offshore patrol vessel of the Overseas Patrol Squadron, in February 2010. In March 2011, her ship and its crew was awarded the Offshore Patrol Vessel Efficiency Trophy for their work over the preceding year. In July 2011, she took command of HMS Clyde, another River-class. HMS Clyde was sent to the Falkland Islands to relieve the HMS Dumbarton Castle as the Falkland Islands Patrol Vessel, which is where it served for the next six months.

In 2012, Jordan returned to the Fleet Air Arm as part of the implementation team for the Fleet Air Arm Manpower Sustainability Project before being promoted to commander. On 10 December 2013, she took command of HMS St Albans to regenerate the ship following refits that began in April of that year in preparation for operations in the Middle East.

In May 2017, Jordan was appointed as aviation chief of staff, Carrier Strike & Aviation Division. In September 2019, she was appointed as commander of the shore establishment HMS Collingwood and the Maritime Warfare School.

=== 2020-present ===
At some point between September 2019 and 22 July 2022, Jordan was promoted to captain. At that point in 2022, she and three other captains, Captains Suzi Nielsen, Sarah Oakley, and Johanna Deakin, spoke to the Royal Navy in regards to the fact that it was the first time all four of the Royal Navy's training establishments, HMS Raleigh, HMS Dartmouth, HMS Sultan, and HMS Collingwood had been under the command of women. Jordan said of this "The good thing about us all being in this position now, is that there’s a high probability it will happen again." They also spoke of their pride in being able to inspire recruits and trainees at the beginning of their careers.

During the preparations for and the state funeral of Queen Elizabeth II, Jordan was responsible for the state ceremonial team and led the Royal Navy State Funeral Gun Carriage alongside Commander Steve Elliott, who served as her deputy during the procession; for Elliott, it was his final duty in uniform after 32 years of service. Jordan was the most senior Royal Naval officer to take part in the procession.

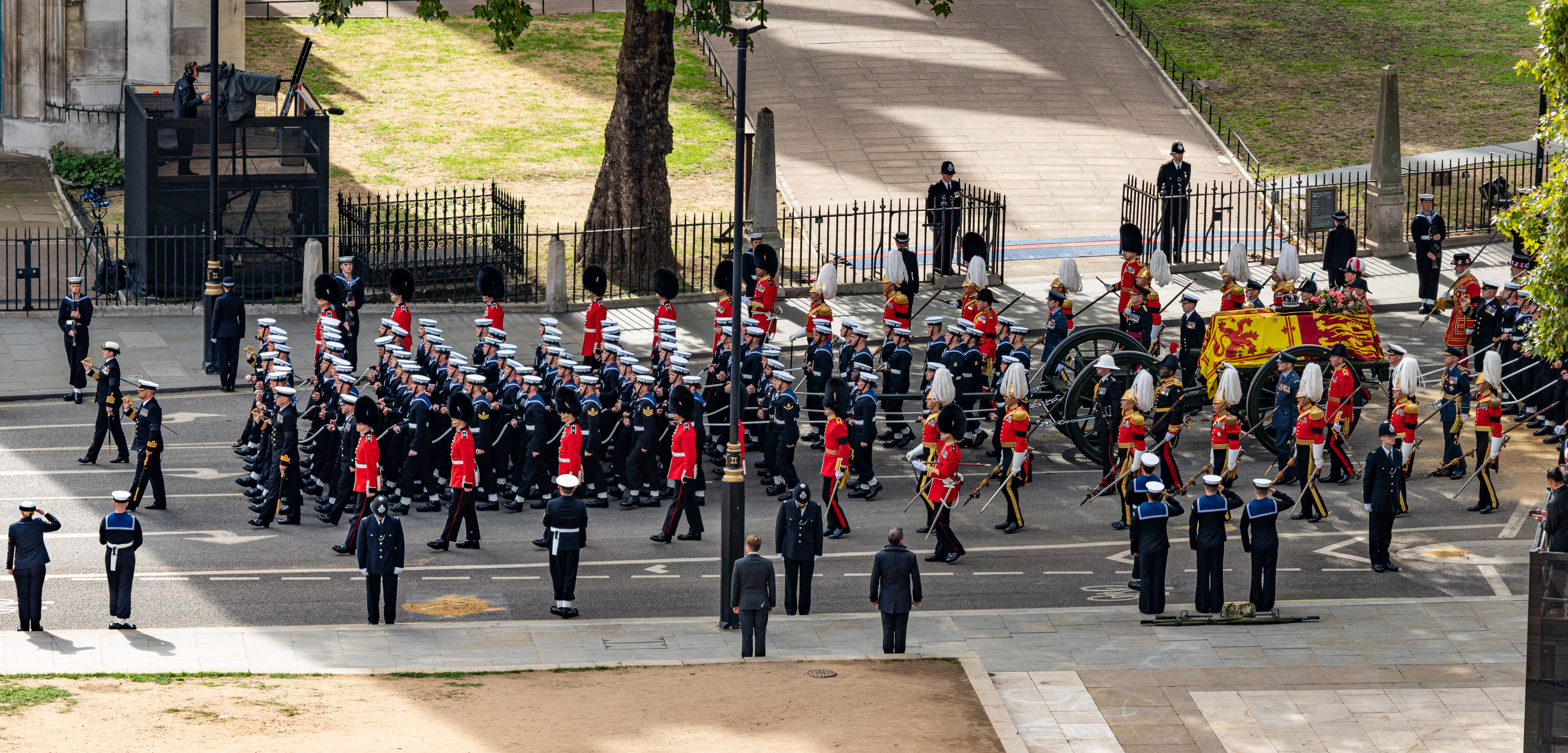
Jordan can be seen to the left of this image, leading the Royal Navy State Funeral Gun Carriage alongside Commander Steve Elliott

On 11 October 2022, Jordan handed command of HMS Collingwood and the Maritime Warfare School to Captain Tim Davey.

On 9 January 2023, Jordan was promoted to commodore. For her role in the state funeral, she was honoured as a Lieutenant of the Royal Victorian Order on the 25 March 2023 Honours List on The Demise of Her Majesty Queen Elizabeth II. On May 30, 2023, 142 men and women of all ranks and branches, including Jordan, were invested with the order by King Charles III.

Commodore Jordan retired from the Royal Navy on 28 July 2026.

== Personal life ==
On 25 December 2012, Jordan gave birth to her first child, a daughter. Since that time, she has given birth to a further two children.

She has been a member of the Worshipful Company of Haberdashers, a Younger Brother of Trinity House, a Freeman of the City of London, the fundraising committee for the National Museum of the Royal Navy and has been a trustee of the Women's Royal Naval Service Benevolent Trust since 2016 and vice chair since 2018.

Catherine has been married to Commodore Andy Jordan, ADC, a now retired Royal Naval officer, since before 2016.
