= Jane Connors (police officer) =

British police officer

Jane Sophie Connors, LVO, QPM (born October 1968) is a senior British police officer. Having served in the Metropolitan Police, she joined Police Scotland in 2023 as Deputy Chief Constable (Operational Policing). She was suspended in Dec 2025 due to serious allegations of bullying.

== Biography ==
She began her service in the Metropolitan Police in east London in 1993, rising to Deputy Assistant Commissioner and heading Met Taskforce and Public Order Planning Command, both within Met Operations. She was awarded the Queen's Police Medal (QPM) in the 2019 Birthday Honours. She was the Strategic Lead for COVID and Violent Crime, in which role she led the investigation into 'Partygate'.

She transferred to Police Scotland in 2023, beginning with Crime and Operational Support. Later that year, in the 2023 Demise Honours, she was appointed Lieutenant of the Royal Victorian Order (LVO) for leading the command team for Operation London Bridge (i.e. Queen Elizabeth II's funeral) the previous year. In June 2023 she was made Director of the Cyber and Fraud Centre - Scotland.

In March 2024 she became Deputy Chief Constable Designate and lead for Local Policing, Change and the response to Violence against Women and Girls (VAWG), having been the initial coordinator and leader on VAWG within the Metropolitan Police.
