= Sir Francis Molyneux, 7th Baronet =

Sir Francis Molyneux, 7th Baronet (1738–1812) was a courtier who became Gentleman Usher of the Black Rod.

== Career ==
Born the son of Sir William Molyneux, 6th Baronet and educated at Queen Elizabeth Grammar School, Wakefield, Francis Molyneux was appointed gentleman usher daily waiter to Queen Charlotte in 1761 (at the age of 23) and Gentleman Usher of the Black Rod in 1765, four years later. He held the post until his death 47 years later.

On his death, as he was unmarried, his baronetcy became extinct and his estates at Teversal and Wellow passed to his sister Julia's son Henry Howard, who took the double-barrelled surname Molyneux-Howard and later Howard-Molyneux-Howard.

There is a memorial to him at St Catherine's Church in Teversal in Nottinghamshire.

Government offices
Preceded by Sir Septimus Robinson	Black Rod; 1765–1812	Succeeded by Sir Thomas Tyrwhitt
Baronetage of England
Preceded by Sir William Molyneux	Baronet (of Teversall); 1781–1812	Extinct
