= Ed Davis (Royal Marines officer) =

British senior Royal Marines officer (born 1963)

Lieutenant General Ed Davis CB CBE KStJ
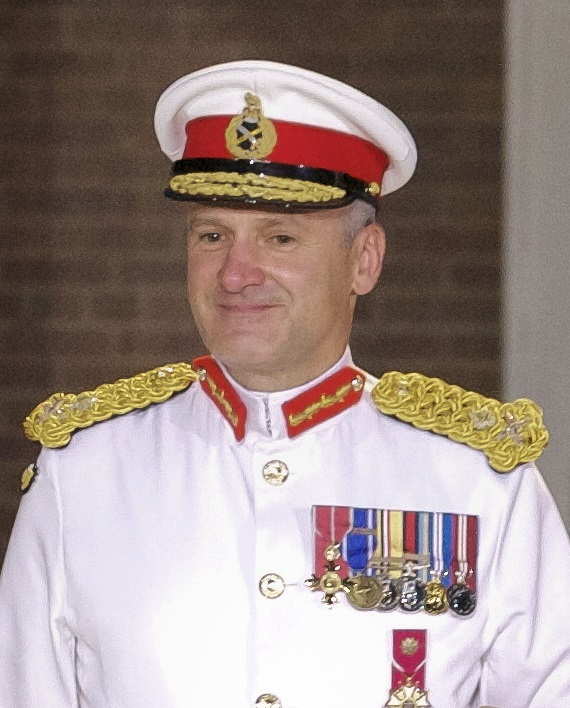
- Ed Davis in August 2012

Gentleman Usher of the Black Rod
- Incumbent
- Assumed office 8 July 2025
- Monarch: Charles III
- Preceded by: Sarah Clarke

Governor of Gibraltar
- In office 19 January 2016 – 18 February 2020
- Monarch: Elizabeth II
- Preceded by: Sir James Dutton
- Succeeded by: Sir David Steel

Personal details
- Born: Edward Grant Martin Davis; 13 February 1963 (age 63) Hereford, England
- Spouse: Lorraine Davis

Military service
- Allegiance: United Kingdom
- Branch/service: Royal Marines
- Years of service: 1981–2016
- Rank: Lieutenant General
- Commands: Commandant General Royal Marines (2011–14); 3 Commando Brigade (2010–11)
- Battles/wars: Bosnian War; War in Afghanistan
- Awards: Companion of the Order of the Bath; Commander of the Order of the British Empire; Knight of the Order of St John; Officer of the Legion of Merit (United States)

Viceregal styles of Ed Davis (2016–2020)
- Reference style: His Excellency
- Spoken style: Your Excellency

Lieutenant General Edward Grant Martin Davis, CB, CBE, KStJ (born 13 February 1963) is a former senior Royal Marines officer. He was Commandant General Royal Marines from December 2011 to June 2014, and the Deputy Commander of NATO's Allied Land Command in Izmir, Turkey, from 2014 to 2015. He was Governor of Gibraltar from 2016 to 2020.

On 8 July 2025, Davis took office as Gentleman Usher of the Black Rod in the House of Lords, succeeding Sarah Clarke.

== Early life ==
Davis was born in Hereford. He was educated at Coleraine Academical Institution, County Londonderry, Northern Ireland and King's College London (MA Defence Studies, 1998).

== Military career ==
Davis was commissioned into the Royal Marines in 1981 and joined 40 Commando with whom he undertook a six-month tour in the Falkland Islands and then a six-month tour in Cyprus. In 1996, he attended the Army Command and Staff Course at Staff College, Camberley. In the same year, he became Chief of Staff at the Headquarters of the Combat Service Support Group (UK) in which role he took part in the Bosnian War. From 2002 to 2004, he was commanding officer of the Special Boat Service (SBS).

He was appointed Chief of Staff to the Commander of the UK's Amphibious Forces in 2007 and was deployed to Afghanistan as Chief of Joint Effects for ISAF. He was appointed Commander of 3 Commando Brigade in January 2010 and again deployed to Afghanistan – this time as the Commander of Task Force Helmand. He became Commandant General Royal Marines in December 2011.

Davis was promoted major general on 10 January 2012, with seniority from 28 November 2011. He was promoted to lieutenant general on 1 July 2014, and succeeded Lieutenant General Gordon Messenger as Deputy Commander of NATO Allied Land Command (LANDCOM)-Izmir.

== Civilian career ==
On 1 October 2015, the Foreign and Commonwealth Office announced that Davis was the designated Governor of Gibraltar after the resignation of Sir James Dutton.

Davis was appointed chair of the Commonwealth Enterprise and Investment Council's office in Gibraltar in 2021. Davis stood down as Chair of CWEIC's Gibraltar Hub after his appointment as the Black Rod.

On 29 April 2025 Davis was confirmed as having been appointed to be the next Black Rod, succeeding Sarah Clarke. He received his insignia and took his oath from King Charles III at Windsor Castle on 8 July 2025.

== Honours and awards ==

| Ribbon | Description | Notes |
| | Order of the Bath | Appointed Companion (CB) in 2014 |
| | Order of the British Empire | Appointed Member (MBE) in 1996; Appointed Officer (OBE) in 2006; Appointed Commander (CBE) in 2011 |
| | Order of St John | Appointed Knight of Grace (KStJ) in 2016 |
| | NATO medal for the former Yugoslavia | |
| | Iraq Medal | With bar |
| | Operational Service Medal for Afghanistan | With bar |
| | Queen Elizabeth II Golden Jubilee Medal | 6 February 2002 |
| | Queen Elizabeth II Diamond Jubilee Medal | 6 February 2012 |
| | Naval Long Service and Good Conduct Medal (1848) | |
| | Legion of Merit | Appointed Officer |

Military offices
| Preceded by Buster Howes | Commandant General Royal Marines; 2011–2014 | Succeeded by Martin Smith |
Government offices
| Preceded by Sir James Dutton | Governor of Gibraltar; 2016–2020 | Succeeded by Sir David Steel |
| Preceded by Sarah Clarke | Black Rod; 2025–present | Incumbent |
