= HMS St Albans (F83) =

2002 Type 23 or Duke-class frigate of the Royal Navy

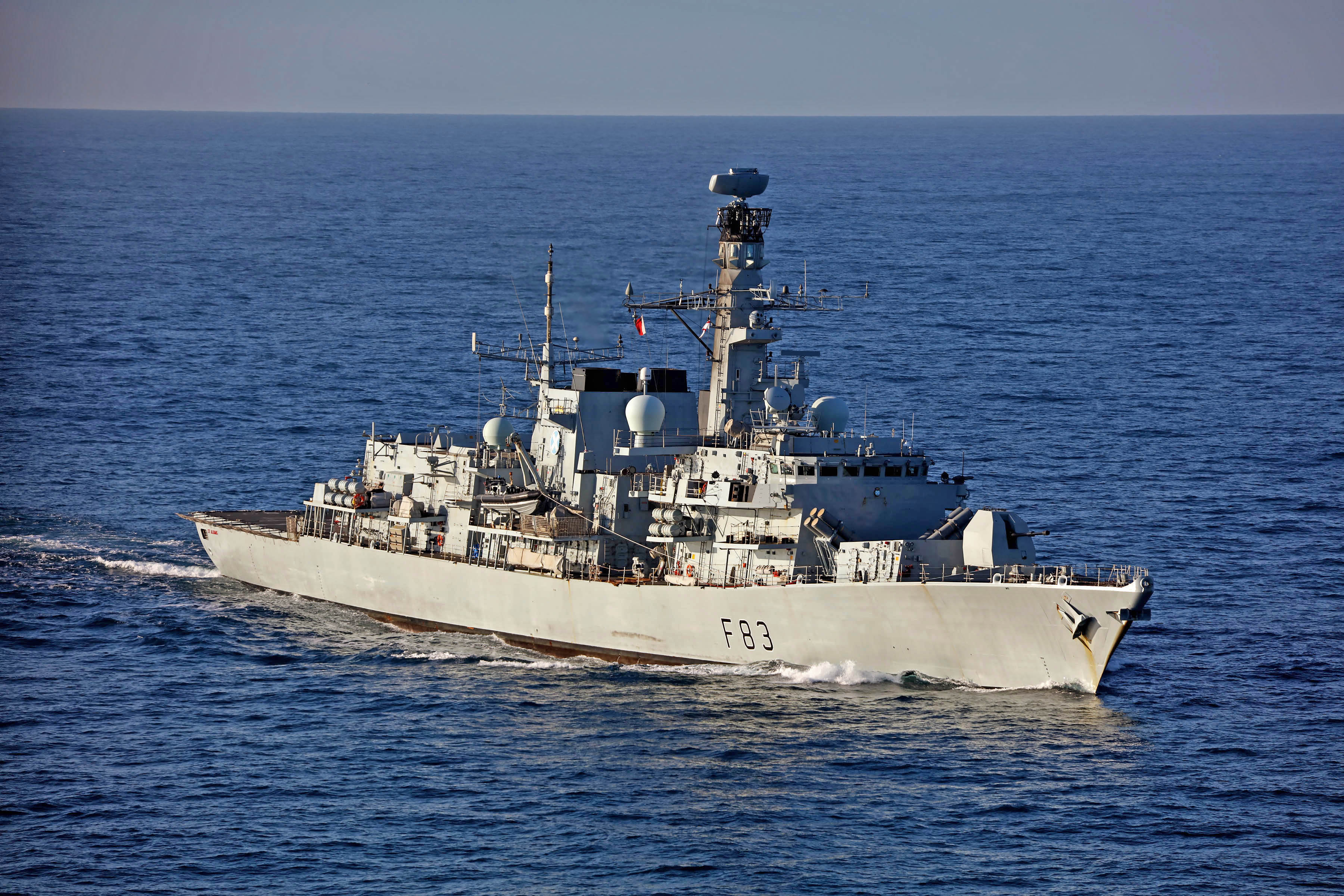
- In 2017, showing upgraded mod 1 main gun

History

United Kingdom
- Name: St Albans
- Ordered: February 1996
- Builder: Yarrow Shipbuilders
- Laid down: 18 April 1999
- Launched: 6 May 2000
- Commissioned: 6 June 2002
- Refit: Major 2013–2015; Major 2019–2023
- Home port: Devonport
- Identification: Pennant number: F83; IMO number: 8949721; MMSI number: 234638000
- Nickname(s): "The Saint"
- Status: In active service
- Badge

General characteristics
- Class & type: Type 23 frigate
- Displacement: 4,900 t (4,800 long tons; 5,400 short tons)
- Length: 133 m (436 ft 4 in)
- Beam: 16.1 m (52 ft 10 in)
- Draught: 7.3 m (23 ft 11 in)
- Propulsion: CODLAG: Four 1,510 kW (2,025 hp) Paxman Valenta 12CM diesel generators; Two GEC electric motors delivering 2,980 kW (4000 hp); Two Rolls-Royce Spey SM1C delivering 23,190 kW (31,100 hp)
- Speed: In excess of 28 knots (52 km/h; 32 mph)
- Range: 7,500 nautical miles (14,000 km; 9,000 mi) at 15 kn (28 km/h; 17 mph)
- Complement: 185 (accommodation for up to 218)
- Electronic warfare & decoys: UAF-1 ESM, or, UAT Mod 1; Seagnat; Type 182 towed torpedo decoy; Surface Ship Torpedo Defence
- Armament: Anti-air missiles: 1 × 32-cell Sea Ceptor GWS 35 Vertical Launching System (VLS) canisters for 32 missiles (1–25+ km) (replaced original Sea Wolf SAM); Anti-ship missiles: 2 × quad Harpoon Block 1C (originally fit, retired 2023; may be replaced by Naval Strike Missile in due course); Anti-submarine torpedoes: 2 × twin 12.75 in (324 mm) Sting Ray torpedo tubes; Guns: 1 × BAE 4.5 inch Mk 8 naval gun; 2 × 30 mm DS30M Mk2 guns, or, 2 × 30 mm DS30B guns; 2 × Miniguns (replaced by Browning .50 caliber heavy machine guns as of 2023); 4 × General-purpose machine guns
- Aircraft carried: 1 × AgustaWestland Merlin HM.2, multi role helicopter, of 829 Naval Air Squadron, RNAS Culdrose, armed with; 4 × Sting Ray torpedoes; 4 × Depth charges; 2 × General-purpose machine gun; 1 × M3M machine gun; or; 1 × Wildcat HMA2, armed with: 4 × Sea Venom anti-ship missiles (initial operating capability from October 2025; full operating capability projected from 2026), or, 2 × Sting Ray anti-submarine torpedoes, or; 20 × Martlet multirole missiles (from 2021); Mk 11 depth charges
- Aviation facilities: Flight deck; Enclosed hangar

HMS St Albans is a Type 23 frigate of the Royal Navy. She is the sixth ship to bear the name and is the sixteenth and final ship in the Duke class of frigates. She is based in Devonport, Plymouth.

== Operational history ==
=== 2000–2010 ===
The ship was launched on the River Clyde on 6 May 2000, built by BAE Systems at Yarrows Yard in Scotstoun, Glasgow.

On 27 October 2002, before entering operational service, St Albans was struck by the P&O ferry Pride of Portsmouth when gale-force winds pushed the ferry into the ship whilst secure on her berth in Portsmouth. St Albans suffered damage to the gun deck, the sea boat supports (davits) and the bridge wing. However, no members of the crew were injured. In 2004, Commander Steve Dainton RN took command and the ship was deployed on Operation Oracle duties in the Arabian Sea. In July that year the crew were granted the Freedom of the City by the Mayor of St Albans.

On 13 February 2006, St Albans departed on a six-month deployment to the Gulf region. She arrived in the region in early April, where her tasks included protecting Iraqi oil platforms as well as patrol duties in the northern Gulf. During the trip, she provided a diplomatic role by visiting 16 countries, including Algeria, Albania, Ukraine, Romania, Bulgaria, Turkey and Lebanon. By 12 July 2006 she had completed her tour in the Gulf and had begun her long journey back to Portsmouth via the Suez Canal and the eastern Mediterranean. However, on the same day, the conflict between Israel and Lebanon began. As a result, the Ministry of Defence announced on 17 July that year that St Albans had been redeployed to assist in Operation Highbrow, the evacuation of British citizens trapped in Lebanon. She arrived in the area on 20 July and the following day picked up 243 evacuees from the dock in Beirut and safely transported them to Cyprus. After completing her role in the evacuation, she remained on operational stand-by in the vicinity of Beirut for a short time before being resuming her voyage home. The ship finally arrived back in Portsmouth on 18 August 2006.

Following the ship's successful six-month tour, St Albans underwent maintenance. During this time, the ship received a new commanding officer, Commander Mark Newland RN. The ship stayed in British waters, participated in submarine training in the Irish Sea, weapon training off the south coast and visited Glasgow on 11 November 2006 to take part in Remembrance Sunday events.

From 5 January until 15 January 2007 the ship was open to the public as part of the London Boat Show. Following this, the ship conducted various training exercises and engineering trials in the UK. The ship's crew then went on Easter leave before returning to conduct more training activities. In May 2007, St Albans entered a period of maintenance that lasted over a year, with her crew temporarily reassigned to other vessels for the duration of the work. The maintenance programme took place in dry dock, situated in Rosyth, with a skeleton crew of engineers supervising the overhaul of several of the ship's systems. Their work included the installation of a new Type 2087 sonar system and converting the ship so that she could operate Merlin helicopters. The upgrade took 15 months and cost £15 million. The ship then returned to her home port of Portsmouth and was accepted back into the fleet in July 2008. The ship was then put through various equipment tests and training routines throughout the later part of the year.

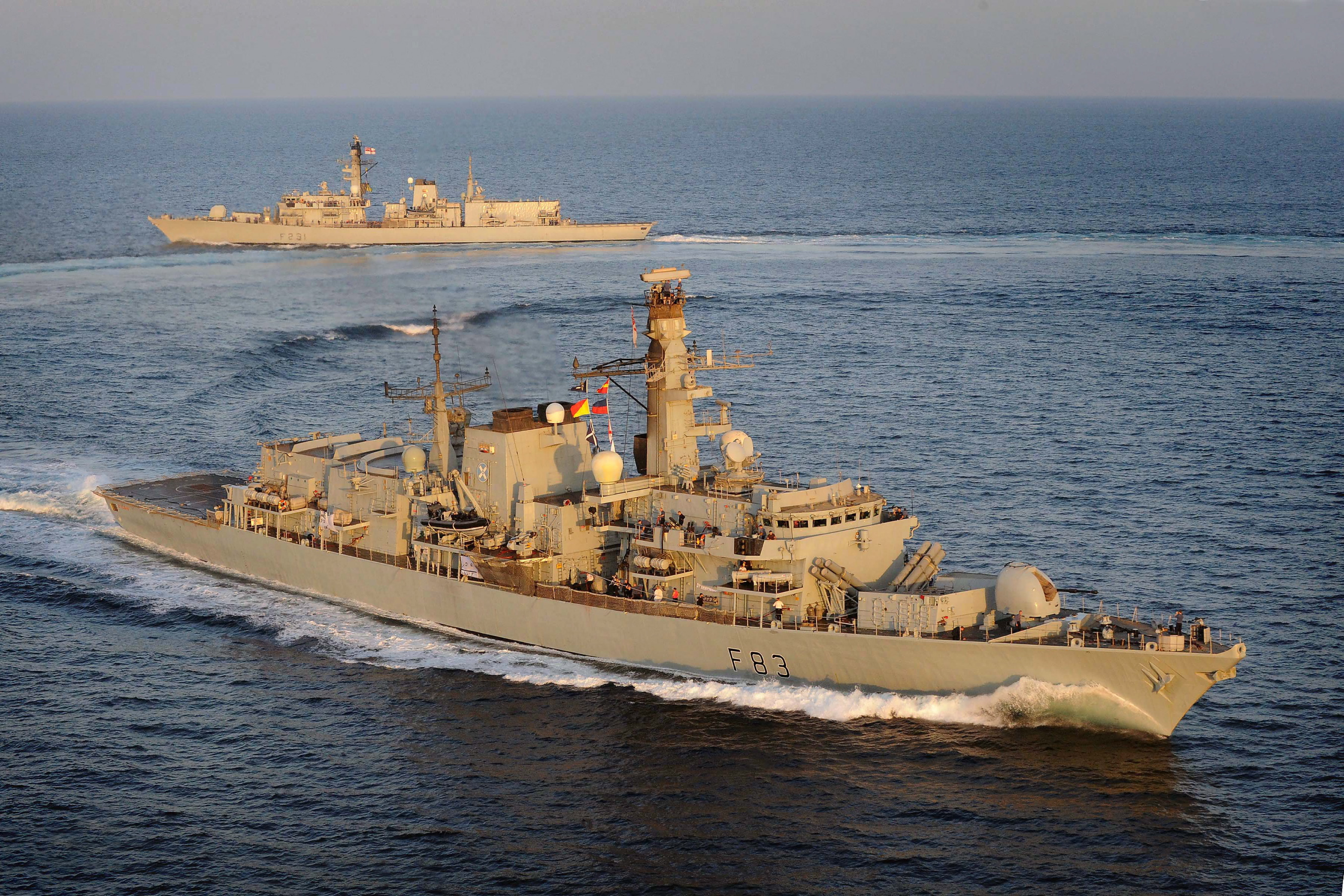
Before refit, with HMS Argyll in 2011

St Albans left Portsmouth on 19 January 2009 to conduct maritime security patrols in the Mediterranean. The ship joined a NATO Task Group in the Mediterranean, protecting busy shipping trade routes. St Albans was also a part of the rapid-response NATO Response Force (NRF). The ship also visited ports in Mallorca, Italy and Egypt whilst in the region. She arrived on the Clyde on 7 May 2009 at 1500hrs, heading for Faslane.

St Albans was deployed in the Persian Gulf until mid-2010. She left Portsmouth on 1000hrs on 1 February on a deployment including supporting international efforts in "tackling piracy, illegal trafficking, and smuggling." Later in that deployment St Albans helped the Iraqi government "protect their oil platforms, and provide security to ensure regional stability". After completing her tour in the Middle East, she visited Grand Harbour, Malta for four days in July 2010 on her way back to the United Kingdom.

=== 2011–present ===
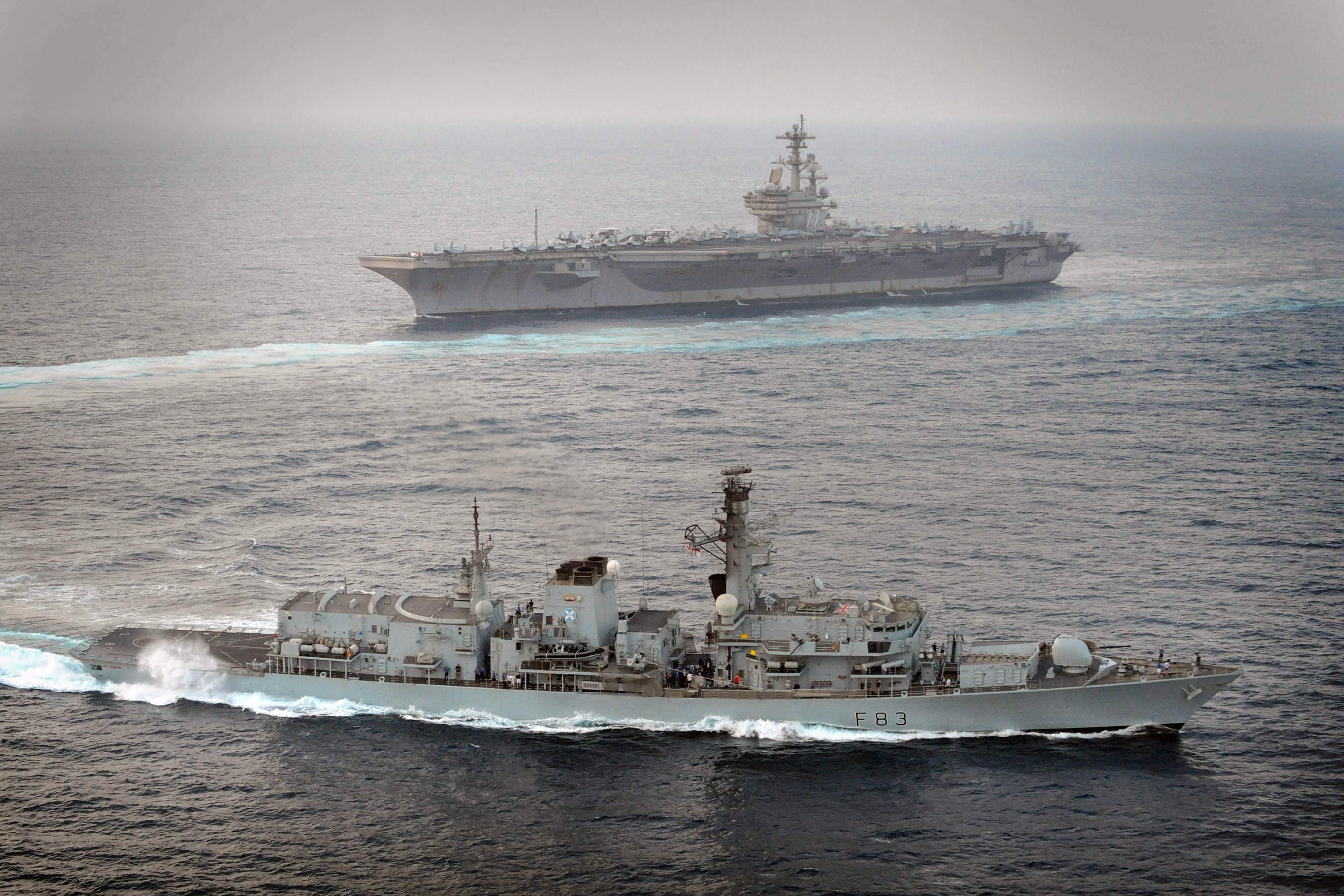
With USS George H. W. Bush on exercise in 2011

2011 saw St Albans become affiliated with the Marketors' Company in addition to the Worshipful Company of Haberdashers. The warship helped in the recovery of a diver who had got into difficulties near Salcombe on 26 March 2011, although the diver was pronounced dead on arrival at hospital. On 1 July 2011, St Albans rescued 13 sailors off the coast of Oman from the stricken tanker MV Pavit, which had spent three days drifting in a heavy storm after losing power. St Albans used her Merlin helicopter embarked from 829 Naval Air Squadron to winch the crew to safety. The rescued sailors were later transferred to their sister ship, the MV Jag Pushpa. After operating in the Middle East conducting counter-terrorism and anti-piracy operations, having relieved the frigate HMS Iron Duke, She returned to Portsmouth, via Malta and Lisbon, in December 2011.

In March 2012, St Albans visited the Pool of London where she entertained a number of her affiliate organisations and other guests before returning to her home port of Portsmouth to conduct exercises in the Western Approaches. In May, she visited Iceland, where the captain Commander Tom Sharpe and Britain's Ambassador to Iceland Ian Whitting cast a wreath into Hvalfjörður, once a staging point for the Arctic convoys to the Soviet Union. After a return to Portsmouth, she sailed up the Elbe to Hamburg to take part in the port's 823rd birthday celebrations. In June, St Albans visited the home of the German Navy in Kiel, joining in the huge maritime event attended by 50 countries, 2,000 yachts and pleasure craft and more than 5,000 yachtsmen and women. Before joining in the celebrations, members of the ship's company, two platoons and the ship's guard headed to a remembrance service and wreath laying at the Commonwealth Cemetery at Nordfriedhof.

St Albans continued her home duties visiting the Channel Islands and Holyhead with an extended tour visiting Stavanger, Oslo and Amsterdam. During this deployment she was the last ship to fire the Royal Navy's 4.5" Mk.8 Mod 0 gun off Stavanger. In May 2013 she was handed over to BAe Systems for a refit in Portsmouth Harbour, her home port, silently coached into C lock. She remained in dock until spring 2014 to be modernised for another 10 years. On 10 December 2013, Commander Catherine Jordan RN took command of the ship.

The refit was a mid-life upgrade, modernizing the ship for the following ten years – it cost £25million and was completed on time in spring 2014. It fitted her with the all-electric 'Kryten' 4.5" Mod1 gun and the mid-life upgrade to her Sea Wolf missile system together with a wide range of more detailed improvements. A new crew was then assembled and the ship undertook an extended period of trials developing her military capability and testing her systems integration. During the trials the ship visited Plymouth and Falmouth.

Passing the Material Assessment and Safety Check on 3 November 2014, St Albans was relaunched on 1 August 2014, before rejoining the fleet. In December 2014 St Albans visited London, mooring alongside HMS Belfast in the Pool of London, and then sailed across the North Sea and down the Nieuwe Maas to visit Rotterdam.

Still based in Portsmouth, she continued trials in the Western English Channel and then visited Trondheim in Norway and continued live firing trials. After completing her extensive Flag Officer Sea Training trails, based at Plymouth, she entered West India Dock, London on 7 July 2015 and then sailed back to Portsmouth. She arrived on 16 July 2015 and became the Guard ship for the Portsmouth America's Cup races later that month. St Albans sailed for a nine-month mission to the Middle East on 27 November 2015, carrying a Merlin HM2 and ScanEagle unmanned aerial vehicle (UAV).

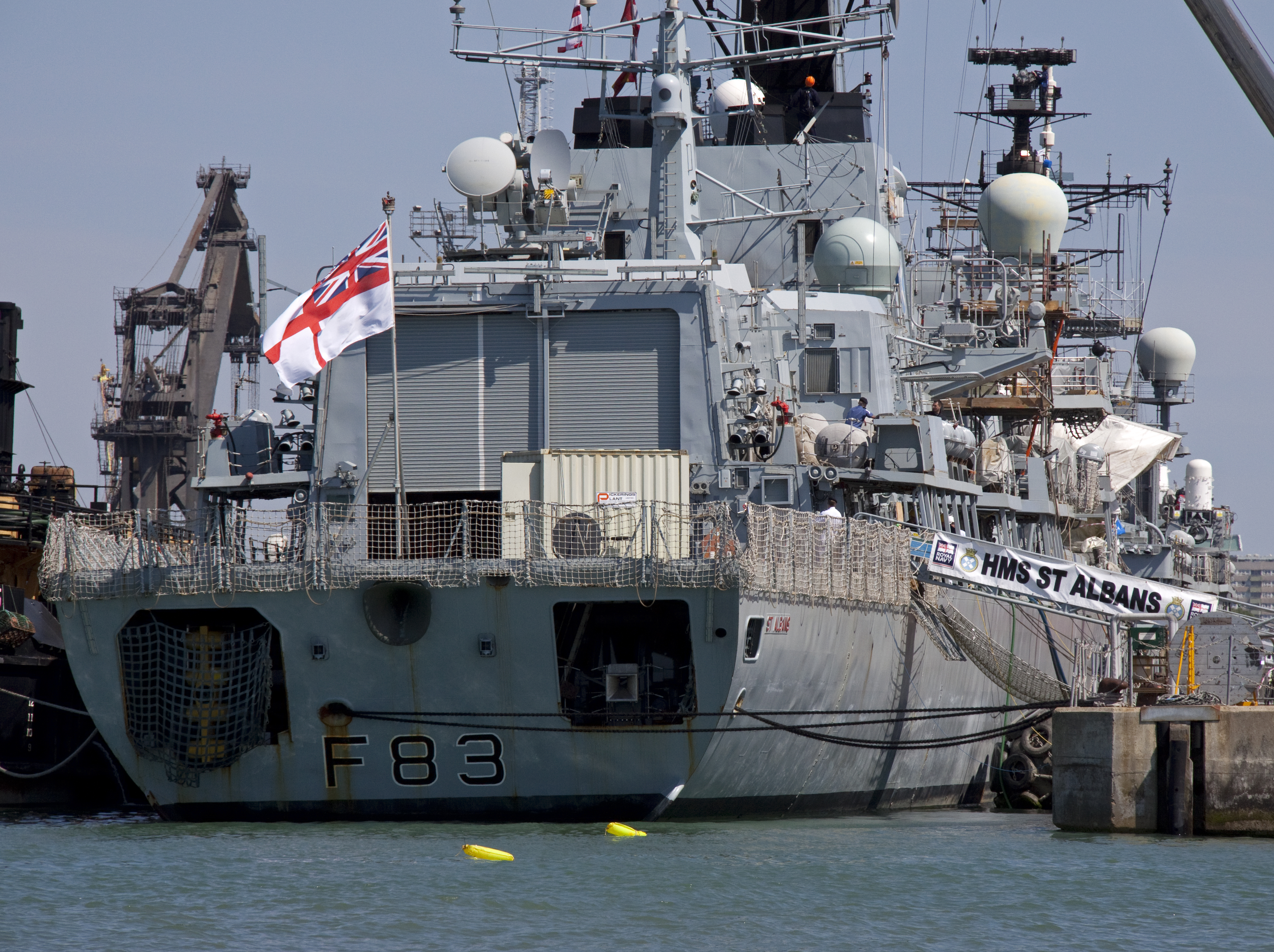
Stern view of St Albans

Whilst crossing the Mediterranean she was involved with the seizure of 320 kg (710 lb) of cocaine with a street value of more than £1 million. On 11 January 2016, Defence Secretary Michael Fallon announced that "HMS St Albans will shortly join the Charles de Gaulle aircraft carrier group" as part of operations against the Islamic State group. She arrived back in Portsmouth on 5 August 2016.

In January 2017 she escorted the Russian aircraft carrier Admiral Kuznetsov along the English Channel on the latter's return voyage from Syria to Kola Bay.

During February 2017 she conducted the Submarine Command Course off the Norwegian Coast and was then awarded the Fleet Effectiveness Flag. She then went into dry dock 'C' in Portsmouth for most of July 2017. Whilst in dry dock, the band of the Royal Yeomanry played under the keel. She returned to service on 29 August 2017 and was operational north of Scotland where she was "man marking" the Russian carrier Admiral Kuznetsov. From 23 to 25 December, she escorted the Russian frigate Admiral Gorshkov which was conducting sea trials in the North Sea close to UK waters.

It was reported in November 2018 that she took part in anti-submarine warfare exercises with Astute.

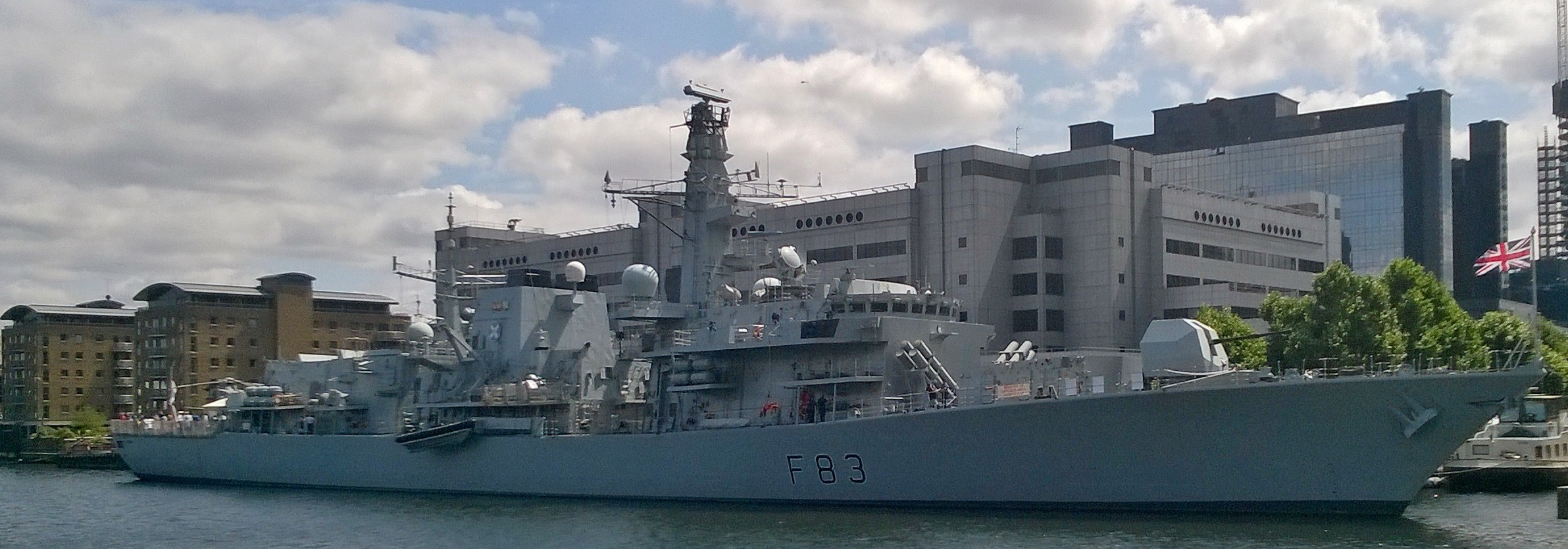
St Albans moored at South Quay, London in 2015

St Albans entered refit in Devonport in July 2019, led by Babcock defence firm. Her refit required around 1.2 million working hours and involved replacing all four diesel engines, installing LED lighting, adapting the ship for the future anti-surface guided weapon system Sea Venom, replacing the original Sea Wolf air defence system with Sea Ceptor, upgrading the ships sensors with the new Type 997 Artisan air-search radar and fitting the submarine-hunting Type 2150 sonar in place of 2050. St Albans became the Royal Navy's most advanced frigate, thanks to those improvements. The vessel returned to sea for trials in March 2024.

In April 2025, the frigate was involved in monitoring Russian vessels operating near the United Kingdom.

In April 2026, it was announced that the frigate, along with P-8 Poseidon aircraft and allies, had tracked a covert Russian submarine operation near critical national infrastructure in UK waters. The Russian operation involved a Akula-class nuclear-powered attack submarine and specialist vessels linked to GUGI.

In August 2026, together with HMS Duncan and HMS Severn, St Albans monitored the Russian ships Admiral Levchenko, Neustrashimy, General Skobelev and Sparta as they moved south from the North Sea through the English Channel.

== Affiliations ==

Duke-class frigates take their names from British dukedoms and HMS St Albans is named after the Dukes of St Albans, among whose descendants is the seventh and present Marqués de Valero de Urría, William Beauclerk, who formerly served as a lieutenant on HMY Britannia.

HMS St Albans' affiliations include:

- City of St Albans
- Worshipful Company of Haberdashers
- Worshipful Company of Marketors
- 2nd Battalion, Royal Anglian Regiment
- Royal Naval Reserve
- RAF Marham
- Haileybury CCF
- Ryde School CCF
- 1st Luton Sea Scouts
- Hertfordshire Sea Cadets.
