= Anthony Knyvett (Black Rod) =

Sir Anthony Knyvett (c. 1486 – 1549) held the office of Black Rod in the English parliament from 1536 to 1543.

He was described as a gentleman usher of the privy chamber to Henry VIII, with Roger Ratcliffe, in the Eltham Ordinance of 1526.

In 1541, he married Avice Gibson, widow of Nicholas Gibson, who founded the Nicholas Gibson Free School, now Coopers' Company and Coborn School.
