= Thomas Tyrwhitt (MP) =

English politician

Sir Thomas Tyrwhitt (1762 – 24 February 1833) was an English politician. He was a Member of Parliament (MP) from 1796 to 1812.

== Career ==
Educated at Eton College and Christ Church, Oxford, after serving as private secretary to the Prince of Wales, Tyrwhitt was elected Member of Parliament (MP) for Okehampton in 1796. Tyrwhitt was responsible for the construction of several roads across Dartmoor, a hamlet called Princetown named in honour of the Prince of Wales, a prison for prisoners of war captured during the Napoleonic Wars now known as HM Prison Dartmoor, as well as the Plymouth and Dartmoor Railway. He became Auditor of the Duchy of Cornwall in 1796 and Lord Warden of the Stannaries in 1803.

He was elected Member of Parliament for Portarlington in 1802 and Plymouth in 1806. In retirement he became Gentleman Usher of the Black Rod.

Parliament of Great Britain
Preceded by Colonel John St Leger; Robert Ladbroke	Member of Parliament for Okehampton; 1796–1802; With: Richard Bateman-Robson	Succeeded by Henry Holland, junior James Charles Stuart Strange
Parliament of the United Kingdom
Preceded by Henry Brook Parnell	Member of Parliament for Portarlington; 1802–1806	Succeeded by John Langston
Preceded by Philip Langmead; Sir William Elford	Member of Parliament for Plymouth; 1806 – 1812; With: Sir William Elford; Sir Charles Pole	Succeeded by Benjamin Bloomfield; Sir Charles Pole
Political offices
Preceded by John Willett Payne	Auditor of the Duchy of Cornwall; 1796–1803	Succeeded by Sir John McMahon
Court offices
Preceded by John Willett Payne	Lord Warden of the Stannaries; 1803 – 1812	Succeeded by Marquess of Hertford
Government offices
Preceded by Sir Francis Molyneux	Black Rod; 1812–1832	Succeeded by Sir Augustus Clifford
