= HMS St Albans =

Six ships of the Royal Navy have borne the name HMS St Albans after the English city and ducal family of St Albans:

- HMS St Albans (1687) was a 50-gun fourth-rate ship of the line launched in 1687. She fought at Bantry Bay in 1689 and at Barfleur in 1691 before being wrecked in a gale in Kinsale harbour in 1693.
- HMS St Albans (1706) was a 50-gun fourth rate launched in 1706. She was rebuilt in 1718 and served in the war against Spain from 1739, mainly in the West Indies. She was wrecked in Kingston during a hurricane in 1744.
- HMS St Albans (1747) was a 60-gun fourth rate launched in 1747. She served against the French from 1756 and participated in the Battle of Lagos (1759) before being sold in 1765.
- HMS St Albans (1764) was a 64-gun third rate launched in 1764. She served under Vice Admiral Lord Richard Howe in the North America station during the American War of Independence from 1777, and was part of the fleet that captured Saint Lucia and won victories at Battle of Saint Kitts and The Saintes. She was converted to a floating battery in 1803, refitted as a 64-gun ship in 1807, recommissioned, and sent out to the East Indies and China. By 1810 she was off Cádiz. She was paid off in 1812 and was broken up in 1814.
- HMS St Albans (I15) was the American destroyer USS Thomas, transferred to Britain in late 1940 as part of the Destroyers for Bases Agreement. Initially used for escort duties, she was transferred to the Russians in 1944 before being returned to be scrapped in 1949.
- HMS St Albans (F83) is a Type 23 Duke-class frigate. She was launched in 2000 and is currently in service.

There was also HMS St Albans Prize, an 18-gun sixth rate captured from the French in 1691 by HMS St Albans (1687) and sold in 1698.

== Battle honours ==
Ships named St Albans have earned the following battle honours:

- Barfleur 1692
- Lagos 1759
- St Lucia 1778
- St Kitts 1782
- The Saints 1782
- Atlantic 1941–43
- English Channel 1942
- Arctic 1942
- North Sea 1943
