= Sarah Clarke (Black Rod) =

British administrator (born 1965)

Dame Sarah Clarke DCB CVO OBE
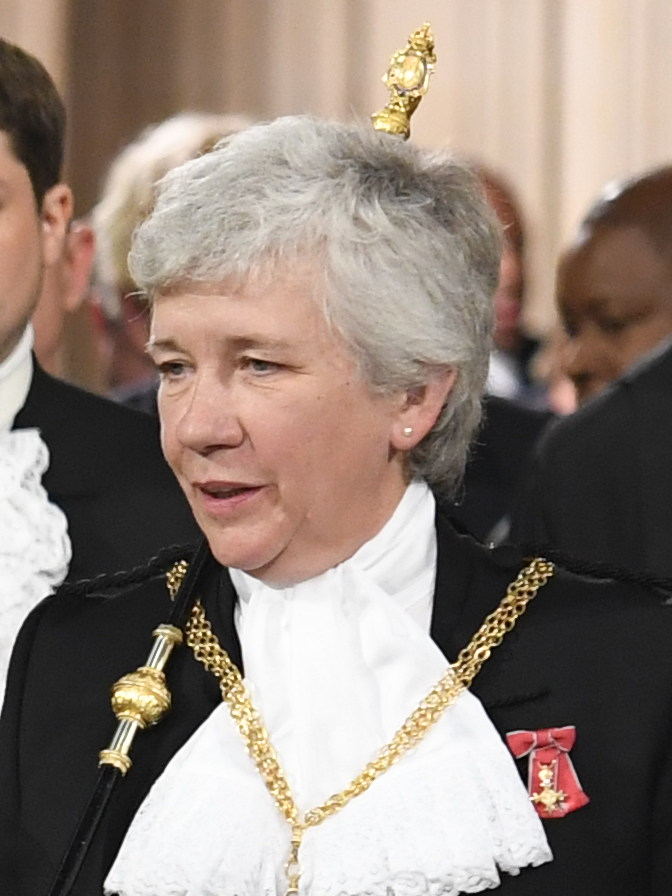
- Clarke in 2019

Lady Usher of the Black Rod
- In office 13 February 2018 – 8 July 2025
- Monarchs: Elizabeth II; Charles III
- Preceded by: David Leakey
- Succeeded by: Ed Davis

Personal details
- Born: 12 October 1965 (age 60) Wolverhampton, England
- Education: University of Leicester

Dame Sarah Davina Clarke (born 12 October 1965) is a British administrator. From 13 February 2018 to 8 July 2025, she served as Black Rod, the first female Black Rod in the 650-year history of the role. During her tenure, the role was formally styled "The Lady Usher of the Black Rod"; for previous incumbents, "The Gentleman Usher of the Black Rod" was used. She was also the first woman to hold the accompanying posts of Serjeant-at-Arms for the House of Lords, Secretary to the Lord Great Chamberlain and to be appointed an Officer of the Order of the Garter.

Before taking this role, she was Championships Director in charge of the administration of The Championships, Wimbledon. She was the first woman to hold this post and the first woman to be a Grand Slam Tournament Director.

On 11 June 2022, she made a rare public speaking appearance in Liverpool, England to address the Annual Meeting of the Women's Institute.

== Early life and education ==
Clarke was born on 12 October 1965 in Wolverhampton, Staffordshire, England. She was educated at Wolverhampton Girls' High School, a grammar school in Wolverhampton: it was also the school of the first Speaker of the House of Lords, Baroness Hayman. She holds a Bachelor of Science degree in Sports Science and Business Studies (1988) from the Roehampton Institute of Higher Education (now the University of Roehampton), a Certificate in Marketing (1993) from the Chartered Institute of Marketing, and a Master of Science degree in Risk Crisis and Disaster Management (2005) from the University of Leicester. She was awarded an honorary doctorate by the University of Wolverhampton in 2018.

== Career in sport ==
During a thirty-year career, Clarke has held senior positions and board roles, with an operational and strategic remit, delivering major events and leading operations in a variety of venues across the UK and abroad. Clarke's first job after graduating was working as an event organiser in Durham. By the mid-1990s, she had progressed to heading up player communications in Europe for the Women's Tennis Association as senior communications manager, at events across Europe and the Far East.

She worked for The Football Association in the operations and events teams for several years and at Wembley Stadium as operations manager in the late 1990s, combining major sports events with large scale concert delivery.

Between 1996 and 2012, she worked on four Olympic Games, including the 2012 Olympic Games in London and was seconded in 2004 to work on the London Olympic Bid Document. Whilst at UK Sport (2000–2005) she was on the board of European and world championships, including sports such as equestrian, athletics, boxing and football. She was a contributor to and editor of Major Sports Events: The Guide, with the team at UK Sport.

Clarke worked 32 Championships at Wimbledon; she started as a school leaver in 1986, looking after the ball boys and girls, and was appointed championships director in 2013, responsible for overall event planning, management and delivery, security, stewarding, ticketing, public safety, catering and player liaison. She was involved with masterplans and the ongoing site development at Wimbledon.

One of her creations as championships director was "The List", a process of capturing details of areas for consideration and improvement from each championship. Interviewed by The Daily Telegraph in 2017, she said "We live for details. We love details".

== Black Rod ==
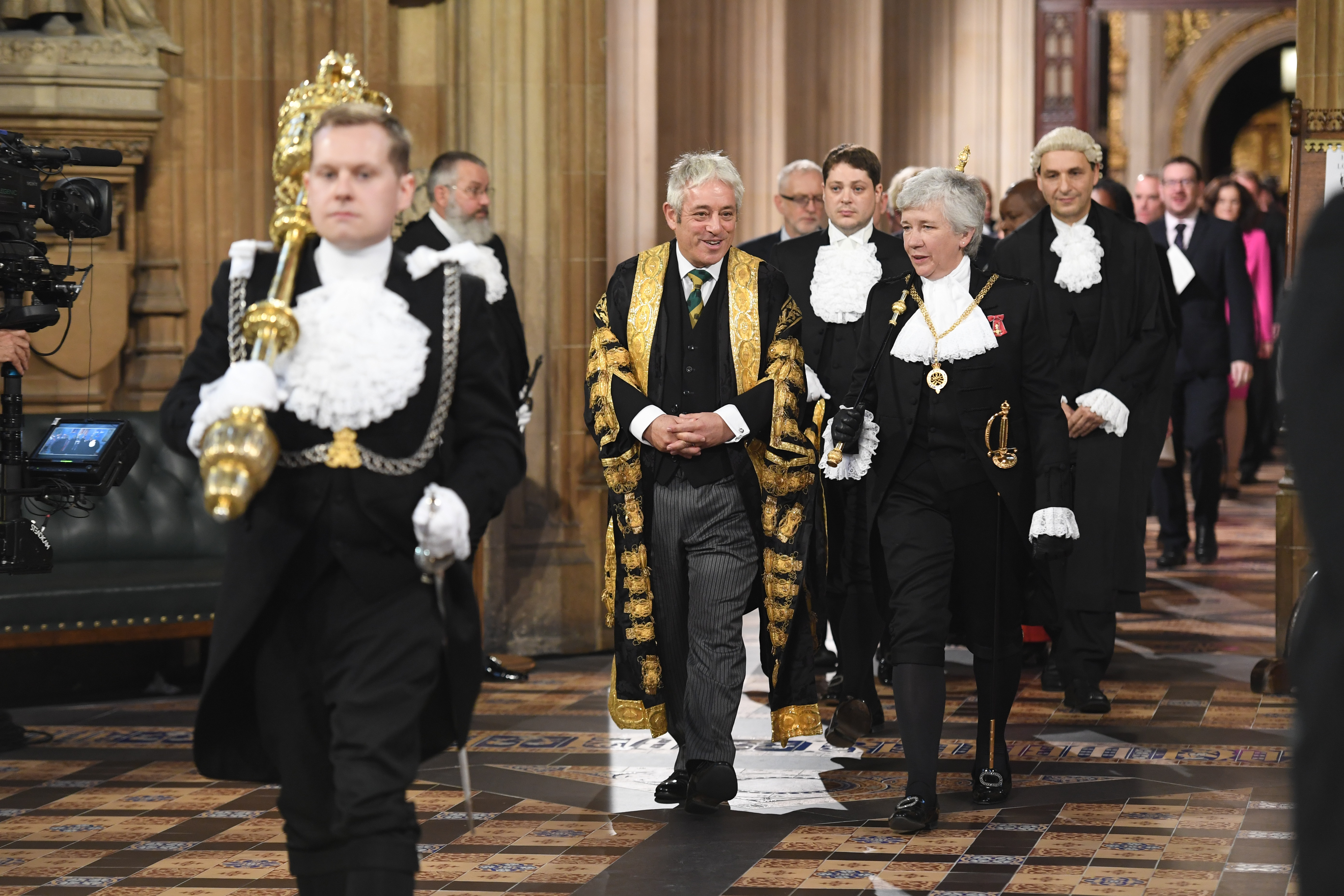
In procession from the Commons to the Lords chamber for the 2019 Queen's Speech

Clarke was appointed Black Rod in November 2017 by Queen Elizabeth II, and took up the role in February 2018, succeeding Lieutenant General David Leakey, who retired in December 2017. In this role, she took part in the State Funeral of Elizabeth II and the Coronation of Charles III and Camilla. She is the first female Black Rod, the post previously having been filled by retired senior officers; she is also the first non-military appointment for almost 200 years.

Clarke headed a department of thirty that plays a significant part in the House of Lords Administration's "front of house" delivery to members and the public, with a key role in the day-to-day running of the House's sittings.

In addition, she was responsible for the organisation and delivery of ceremonial events, such as State Opening and state visits to Westminster and for the daily administration of the King's residual estate in the Palace of Westminster including the Chapel of St Mary Undercroft, the Robing Room and the Royal Gallery. There are also many annual one-off events, which the department delivers each year.

She was Chair of the Bicameral Parliamentary Business Resilience Board from 2020.

As a central contact point for members of the House during the day-to-day business, the department has responsibility for facilitating and controlling access to the Chamber and the precincts of the House and maintaining order within them. It also plays a leading part in business resilience. It works closely with the Clerks, Security Department, Facilities Department and the R&R teams, as well as external partners where relevant.

In February 2025, she announced that she would be retiring from the role of Black Rod later that year, after a "most extraordinary" seven-and-a-half years in post. On 29 April 2025, Lt Gen Ed Davis was confirmed as the next Black Rod; he officially succeeded her on 8 July 2025.

== Honours ==
Clarke was appointed an Officer of the Order of the British Empire (OBE) in the 2018 Birthday Honours "for services to sports administration". She later was appointed a Commander of the Royal Victorian Order (CVO) in the 2023 Demise Honours “for services to the Lying‑in‑State of Her Majesty Queen Elizabeth II”. In the 2026 New Year Honours, Clarke was made a Dame Commander of the Order of the Bath (DCB) "for services to parliament".

Government offices
Preceded by David Leakey	Black Rod; 2018–2025	Succeeded by Ed Davis
