= Black Rod =

Senior parliamentary officer

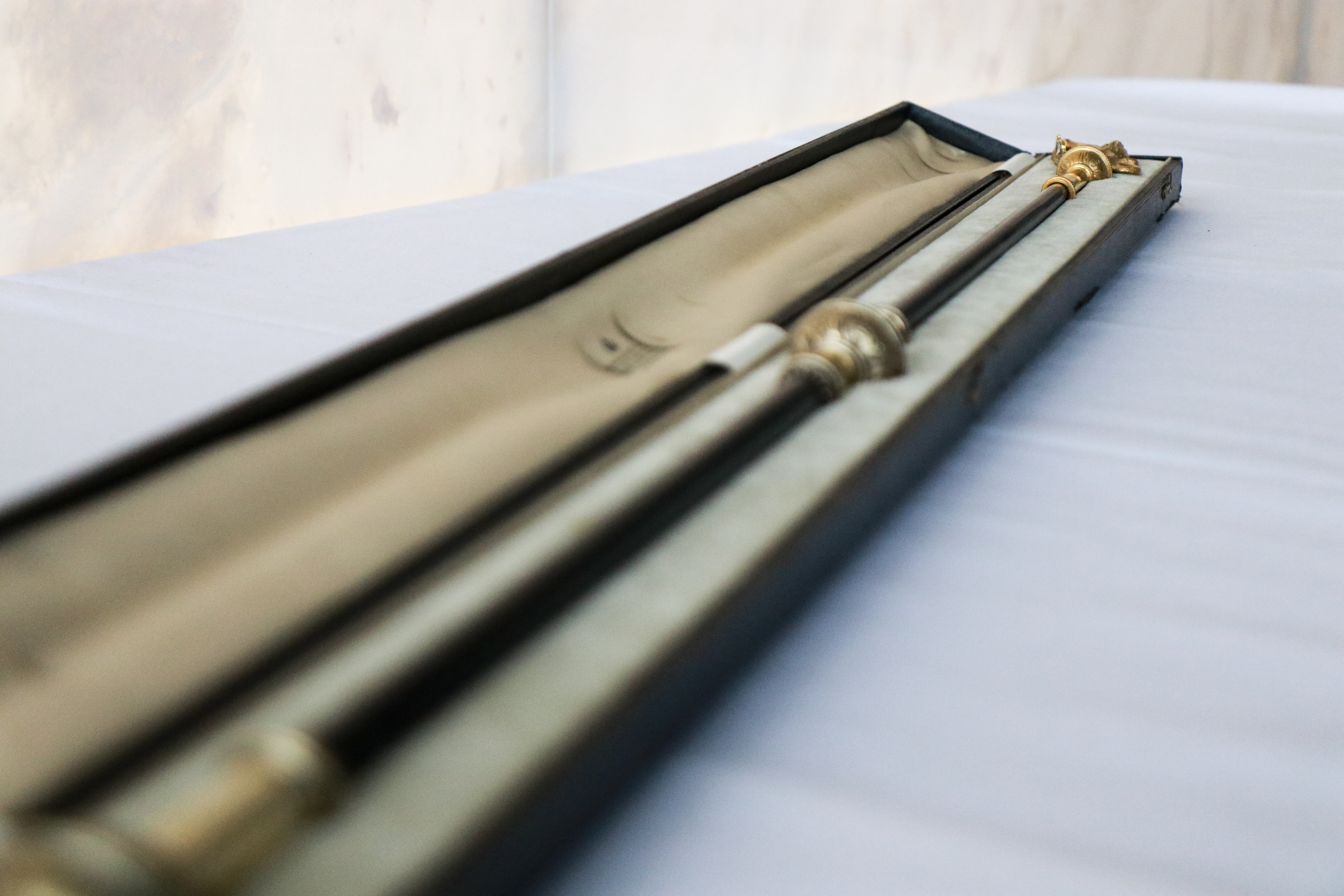
The ceremonial rod used by the Black Rod of New Zealand

The Gentleman or Lady Usher of the Black Rod, often shortened to Black Rod, is a senior parliamentary officer in the House of Lords responsible for ceremonial protocol, maintaining order, and controlling access to the chamber and its precincts.

Black Rod is also an officer of the Order of the Garter and serves as secretary to the Lord Great Chamberlain and as Serjeant-at-Arms of the House. Black Rod is best known for the ceremony at the State Opening of Parliament, in which Black Rod summons members of the House of Commons to attend the monarch's speech in the House of Lords. As part of the ceremony, the doors of the Commons chamber are closed before Black Rod, who then strikes the door three times with the staff of office before the Commons admits Black Rod.

Equivalent offices exist in several other Westminster-style legislatures, including in Australia, Canada, New Zealand, South Africa, and the Cook Islands.

== Origin ==
The office was created in 1350 by royal letters patent, though the current title dates from 1522. The position was adopted by other members of the Commonwealth when they adopted the British Westminster system. The title is derived from the staff of office, an ebony staff topped with a golden lion, which is the main symbol of the office's authority.

A ceremonial rod or staff is a common symbol indicating the authority of the office holder. Depictions of ancient authority figures in many cultures include such a rod (alternatively called a sceptre). Another early example is the fasces (a bound bundle of rods) carried by guards ("lictors") who accompanied high-level officials in the Roman Republic and later Empire.

Originally The Office of the Black Rod had no direct connection with Parliament and was associated with the Order of the Garter. By the early 16th century, an usher of the Parliament Chamber was holding the office of Black Rod as well, and the two positions became increasingly connected. By the 17th century, the parliamentary functions of Black Rod had become firmly established, contributing to the office's development into a senior official of the House of Lords.

== By country ==
Ushers of the Black Rod are typically responsible for arresting any senator or intruder who disrupts the proceedings.

=== United Kingdom ===
Gentleman Usher of the Black Rod

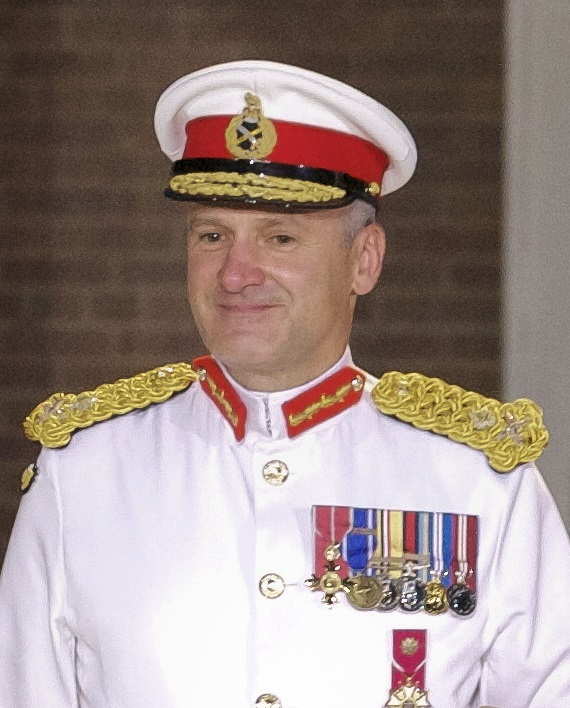
- Incumbent; Lieutenant General Ed Davis since 8 July 2025
- Parliament of the United Kingdom
- Reports to: Clerk of the Parliaments
- Appointer: The Crown (de jure); Clerk of the Parliaments (de facto)
- Formation: 1350
- First holder: Walter Whitehorse (known)
- Deputy: Yeoman Usher of the Black Rod
- Website: Parliamentary information page

==== Appointment ====
Black Rod is formally appointed by the Crown based on a recruitment search performed by the Clerk of the Parliaments (who is the employer of all House of Lords officials). As well as being an officer of the House of Lords, Black Rod is an officer of the Order of the Garter; they are appointed by letters patent under the Garter Seal. Black Rod also acts as Secretary to the Lord Great Chamberlain by virtue of which they oversee certain ceremonial arrangements and day-to-day management of the Royal parts of the Palace of Westminster. Black Rod also holds the office of Serjeant-at-Arms, to which they are separately appointed by letters patent under the Great Seal; it is in this capacity that Black Rod attends upon the Lord Speaker. Black Rod's deputy is the Yeoman Usher of the Black Rod and Deputy Serjeant-at-Arms.

Since 8 July 2025, the post of Gentleman Usher of the Black Rod has been held by Lieutenant General Edward Davis; he is the first Royal Marine to hold the post.

==== Official duties ====
Black Rod is principally responsible for controlling access to and maintaining order within the House of Lords and its precincts, as well as for ceremonial events within those precincts. Previous responsibilities for security, and the buildings and services of the Palace of Westminster, have been passed, respectively, to the Parliamentary Security Director (as of the post's creation in January 2016) and Lords Director of Facilities (as of that post's creation and the retirement of the then-Black Rod in May 2009).

Black Rod's official duties also include responsibility as the usher and doorkeeper at meetings of the Most Noble Order of the Garter; the personal attendant of the Sovereign in the Lords; as secretary to the Lord Great Chamberlain and as the Serjeant-at-Arms and Keeper of the Doors of the House, in charge of the admission of strangers to the House of Lords. Either Black Rod or their deputy, the Yeoman Usher, is required to be present when the House of Lords, the upper house of Parliament, is in session, and plays a role in the introduction of all new Lords Temporal in the House (but not of bishops as new Lords Spiritual). Black Rod also arrests any Lord guilty of breach of privilege or other Parliamentary offence, such as contempt or disorder, or the disturbance of the House's proceedings. Their equivalent in the House of Commons is the Serjeant at Arms.

Former Black Rod David Leakey said that 30% of his work as Black Rod was within or for the House of Commons.

Black Rod, along with their deputy, is responsible for organising ceremonial events within the Palace of Westminster, providing leadership in guiding the significant logistics of running such events.

==== Ceremonial duties ====
===== Mace =====
Black Rod is in theory responsible for carrying the Mace into and out of the chamber for the Speaker of the House of Lords (formerly the Lord Chancellor, now the Lord Speaker), though this role is delegated to the Yeoman Usher and Deputy Serjeant-at-Arms, or on judicial occasions, to the Lord Speaker's deputy, the Assistant Serjeant-at-Arms.

===== State Opening of Parliament =====
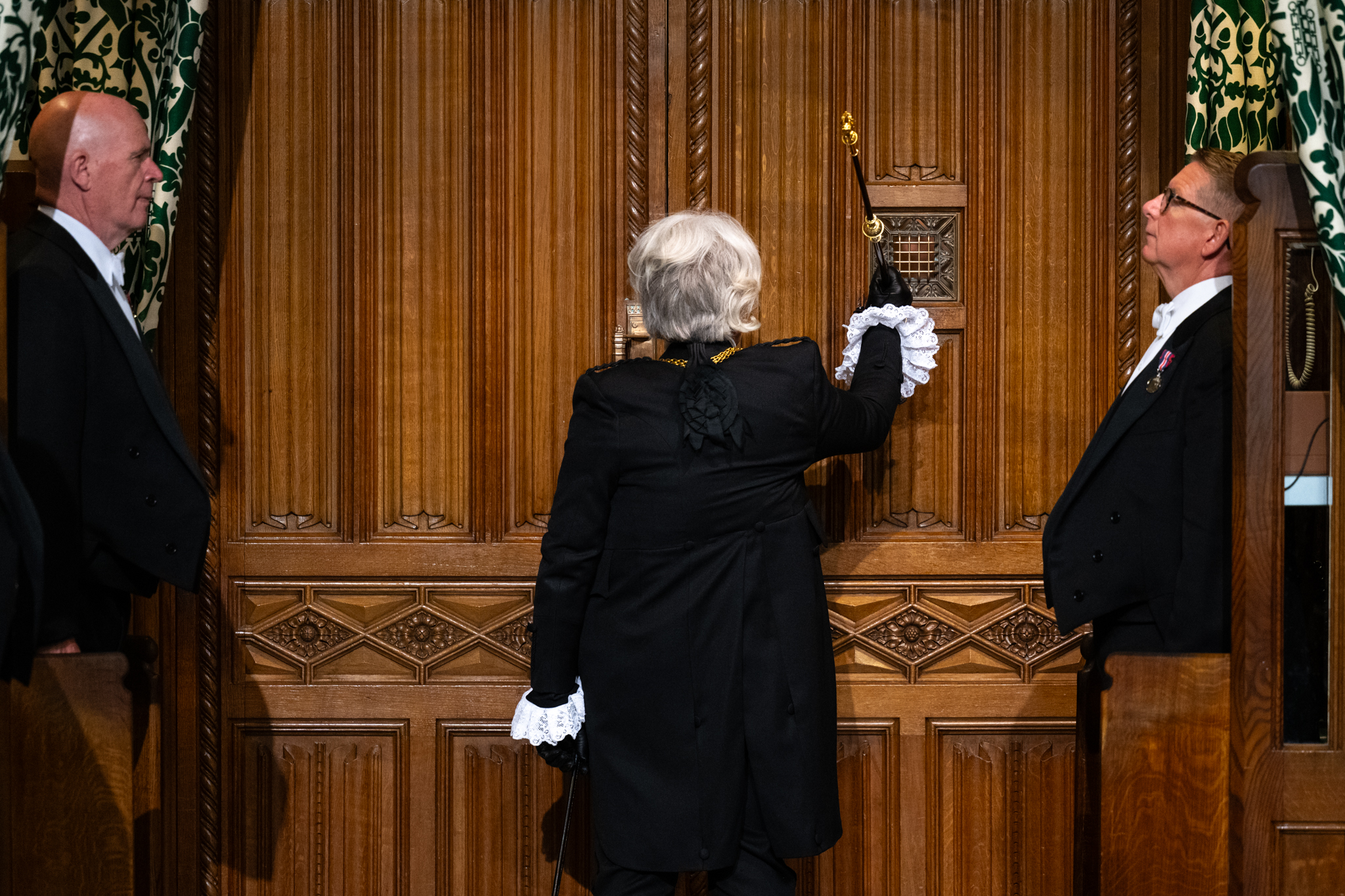
Sarah Clarke, Lady Usher of the Black Rod, knocks on the door to the House of Commons at the 2024 State Opening.

Black Rod is best known for their part in the ceremonies surrounding the State Opening of Parliament and the Speech from the throne. Black Rod summons the Commons to attend the speech and leads them to the Lords. The door of the House of Commons is traditionally shut in Black Rod's face, symbolising the Commons' independence from the monarch.. Black Rod then strikes the door three times with their staff, and is then admitted and issues the summons of the monarch to attend.

This ritual also happens whenever the Lords have a commission to be read and Black Rod summons MPs to hear it. For example, on Tuesday 17 December 2019 this ritual happened twice.

It is commonly assumed to be derived from the attempt by Charles I to arrest Five Members in 1642, in what was seen as a breach of the Constitution; this and prior actions of the King led to the Civil War. However, there is evidence that at least elements of it existed much earlier; only elusive mentions are made in journals of the house and in private diaries of the Commons being summoned by order of the monarch, but not how, although it is implied to be an ancient practice. On at least one notable occasion in March 1629, Black Rod was kept out of the chamber by members who wanted to finish business. A detailed description of the ceremony exists from 1679, written by Edward Carteret to instruct his deputy Thomas Duppa, and is very similar to the present custom, except that the doors may have been left closed at the arrival of Black Rod rather than slammed before him, and he is told to knock "four or five times" rather than three.

The ritual is widely interpreted to symbolise the independence of the Commons from the Sovereign and their rights to question the right of his representatives to enter their chamber, although they cannot bar them from entering with lawful authority. It may have been inspired by the proclamation of a new monarch at Temple Bar, the ceremonial entrance to the City of London, before which the royal messengers had to obtain from the lord mayor and aldermen to open the doors and let them in. However, Erskine May: Parliamentary Practice states that this is to allow the Commons to ascertain Black Rod's identity.

==== List of Black Rods in England, Great Britain and the UK from 1361 ====
This list is derived from one published by the Parliamentary Archives in 2011, with alterations from later research.

- c.1361–1387: Walter Whitehorse
- 1387–1399: John Cray
- 1399–1410: Thomas Sy
- 1410–1413: John Sheffield
- 1413–1415: John Athelbrigg
- 1415–1418: William Hargroave
- 1418–1423: John Clifford
- 1423–1428: John Carsons
- 1428–1459: William Pope
- 1438–1459: Robert Manfield (joint)
- 1459–1461: John Penycok
- 1461–1471: Vacant ?
- 1471–1485: William Evington
- 1483–1485: Edward Hardgill (joint)
- 1485–1489: Robert Marleton
- 1489–1513: Ralph Assheton
- 1495–30 December 1511: Hugh Denys (jointly with Assheton until Denys's death)
- 1513–1526: Sir William Compton
- 1526–1536: Henry Norreys
- 1536–1543: Anthony Knyvett
- 1543–1554: Sir Philip Hoby
- 1554–1565: John Norreys
- 1554–1591: Sir William Norreys (joint)
- 1591–1593: Anthony Wingfield (d. 1593)
- 1593–1598: Simon Bowyer
- 1598–1620: Richard Coningsby
- 1605–1620: George Pollard (joint)
- 1620–1642: James Maxwell
- 1642–1649: Alexander Thayne (as recognised by Parliament); jointly with James Maxwell until c. 1646. The Lords was abolished in 1649 and Thayne made a claim to the title at the Restoration in 1661, but was denied.
- 2 March 1645 – 1661: Peter Newton (as recognised by the Royalists; Edward Ellis discharged the duties in 1642 and Newton in 1644, but neither seems to have been formally appointed at the time.)
- 1671–1675: Sir John Ayton
- 1671–1683: Sir Edward Carteret
- 1683–25 April 1694: Sir Thomas Duppa
- 1694–25 August 1698: Sir Fleetwood Sheppard
- 5 December 1698 – 1 June 1710: Admiral Sir David Mitchell
- 1710–1718: Sir William Oldes
- 1718–1727: Sir William Sanderson, 1st Baronet
- 1727–1747: Sir Charles Dalton
- 1747–1760: Sir Henry Bellenden
- 1760 – 6 September 1765: Sir Septimus Robinson
- 1765 – 1812: Sir Francis Molyneux, 7th Baronet
- 1812 – 25 July 1832: Sir Thomas Tyrwhitt
- 25 July 1832 – 8 February 1877: Admiral Sir Augustus Clifford
- 3 May 1877 – 23 June 1883: General Sir William Knollys
- 24 July 1883 – 7 October 1895: Admiral Sir James Drummond
- 16 December 1895 – 23 July 1901: General Sir Michael Biddulph
- August 1904 – 16 December 1919: Admiral Sir Henry Stephenson
- January 1920 – 14 May 1941: Lieutenant-General Sir William Pulteney
- October 1941 – 15 August 1944: Air Chief Marshal Sir William Mitchell
- January 1945 – 18 January 1949: Sir Vice-Admiral Geoffrey Blake
- 18 January 1949 – 18 June 1963: Lieutenant-General Sir Brian Horrocks
- 18 June 1963 – October 1970: Air Chief Marshal Sir George Mills
- October 1970 – 18 January 1978: Admiral Sir Frank Twiss
- 10 January 1978 – January 1985: Lieutenant-General Sir David House
- January 1985 – January 1992: Air Chief Marshal Sir John Gingell
- January 1992 – 8 May 1995: Admiral Sir Richard Thomas
- 9 May 1995 – 8 May 2001: General Sir Edward Jones
- 9 May 2001 – 30 April 2009: Lieutenant-General Sir Michael Willcocks
- 30 April 2009 – 28 October 2010: Lieutenant-General Sir Frederick Viggers
- 21 December 2010 – 21 December 2017: Lieutenant-General David Leakey
- 12 February 2018 – 8 July 2025: Dame Sarah Clarke
- 8 July 2025 – present: Lieutenant-General Edward Davis

==== List of Serjeants-at-Arms of the House of Lords ====
Technically the serjeant-at-arms was an officer of the Lord Chancellor (the former presiding officer of the House of Lords), rather than of the House of Lords. He was appointed by the Sovereign "to be Serjeant-at-Arms in Ordinary to Her [or His] Majesty" and "to attend the Right Honourable the Lord Chancellor, Lord Keeper or Lord Commissioner for the Great Seal of the Realm for the time being". He was appointed for life until 1713 and during good behaviour thereafter, originally receiving a daily remuneration and from 1806 an annual salary. The post was merged with that of Yeoman Usher of the Black Rod in 1962, and with that of Gentleman Usher of the Black Rod in 1971.

The following is a list of Serjeants-at-Arms to the Lord Chancellor since 1660:

- 1660: Humphrey Leigh
- 1668: Edward Wood (in Extraordinary; did not succeed to the reversion)
- 1671: Sir George Charnock (in Extraordinary)
- 1673: Sir George Charnock (in Ordinary) jointly with Roger Charnock
- 1697: Drew Sowle
- 1713: Sarles Goatley
- 1713: Charles Stone
- 1716: Francis Jephson
- 1745: Richard Jephson
- 1789: William Watson
- 1818: George Francis Seymour
- 1841: Alexander Perceval
- 1858: Colonel Sir Wellington Patrick Manvers Chetwynd Talbot
- 1899: Major-General Sir Arthur Edward Augustus Ellis
- 1901: Lieutenant-Colonel Sir Fleetwood Isham Edwards
- 1910: Major-General Sir Stanley de Astel Clarke
- 5 November 1910: Captain Sir Seymour John Fortescue
- 1 February 1936: Major-General Sir Charles Edward Corkran
- 17 March 1939: Admiral Sir Herbert Meade-Fetherstonhaugh
- 2 December 1946: Air Vice-Marshal Sir Paul Copeland Maltby
- 17 March 1962: Captain Sir Kenneth Lachlan Mackintosh (Note: Mackintosh served as "Secretary to the Lord Great Chamberlain, Yeoman Usher of the Black Rod and Serjeant-at-Arms".)
- 1 January 1971: Admiral Sir Frank Twiss (Note: Twiss had been appointed Gentleman Usher of the Black Rod in 1970; in 1971 he was in addition appointed Secretary to the Lord Great Chamberlain, Serjeant at Arms to the Lord Chancellor and the Agent of the Administration Committee.)

Since 1971 the office of Serjeant at Arms has been held by the Gentleman Usher of the Black Rod.

==== Devolved assemblies ====
The Parliament of Northern Ireland was created in 1921, suspended in 1972, and abolished in 1973. The Senate of Northern Ireland, its upper house, had a Black Rod throughout its existence, who carried messages from the Senate to the House of Commons, and at the annual opening of Parliament summoned MPs and Senators to the foot of the "Imperial Staircase" in Parliament Buildings from where the Governor of Northern Ireland made the speech. The "Gentleman Usher of the Black Rod in attendance on the Senate of Northern Ireland" was also appointed "Deputy Sergeant-at-Arms in attendance on the House of Commons of Northern Ireland", and likewise the Commons Sergeant-at-Arms was Deputy Black Rod. Black Rod's wand, uniform, and sword are now part of the collection of the Northern Ireland Assembly Commission. The wand is an ebony staff, 37 inches (940 mm) long, with silver gilt mounts dated London 1923. It was in storage in 2007, and on display in the First Ministers office in 2012. The first Black Rod was Sir Frederick Moneypenny, the Belfast City Chamberlain and Private Secretary to the Lord Mayor, who served on a provisional basis and took no salary. Later holders of the office were Major Thomas Dalby Hutcheson Hackett (1921–1954), Brigadier John Young Calwell (1954–1968), and Captain (RN) J. C. Cartwright (1969–1972).

The white paper leading to the 1973 Northern Ireland Assembly said it "should be modern in character and the pomp of English historical features such as Black Rod, Sergeants at Arms, etc., should be abandoned". Subsequent devolved legislatures (the 1998 Northern Ireland Assembly, Scottish Parliament, and Welsh Senedd) have been unicameral and none has a Black Rod.

=== Australia ===
The Australian Senate and the upper houses in five Australian states and territories have their own Usher of the Black Rod. (Queensland abolished its upper house, and the assemblies of the Northern Territory and the Australian Capital Territory have always been unicameral.)

The current Usher of the Black Rod for the Australian Senate is John Begley. In the Australian Senate, the Usher of the Black Rod assists with the administration and security of the Senate and has the power to take anyone into custody who causes a disturbance in or near the Senate chamber.

=== Canada ===
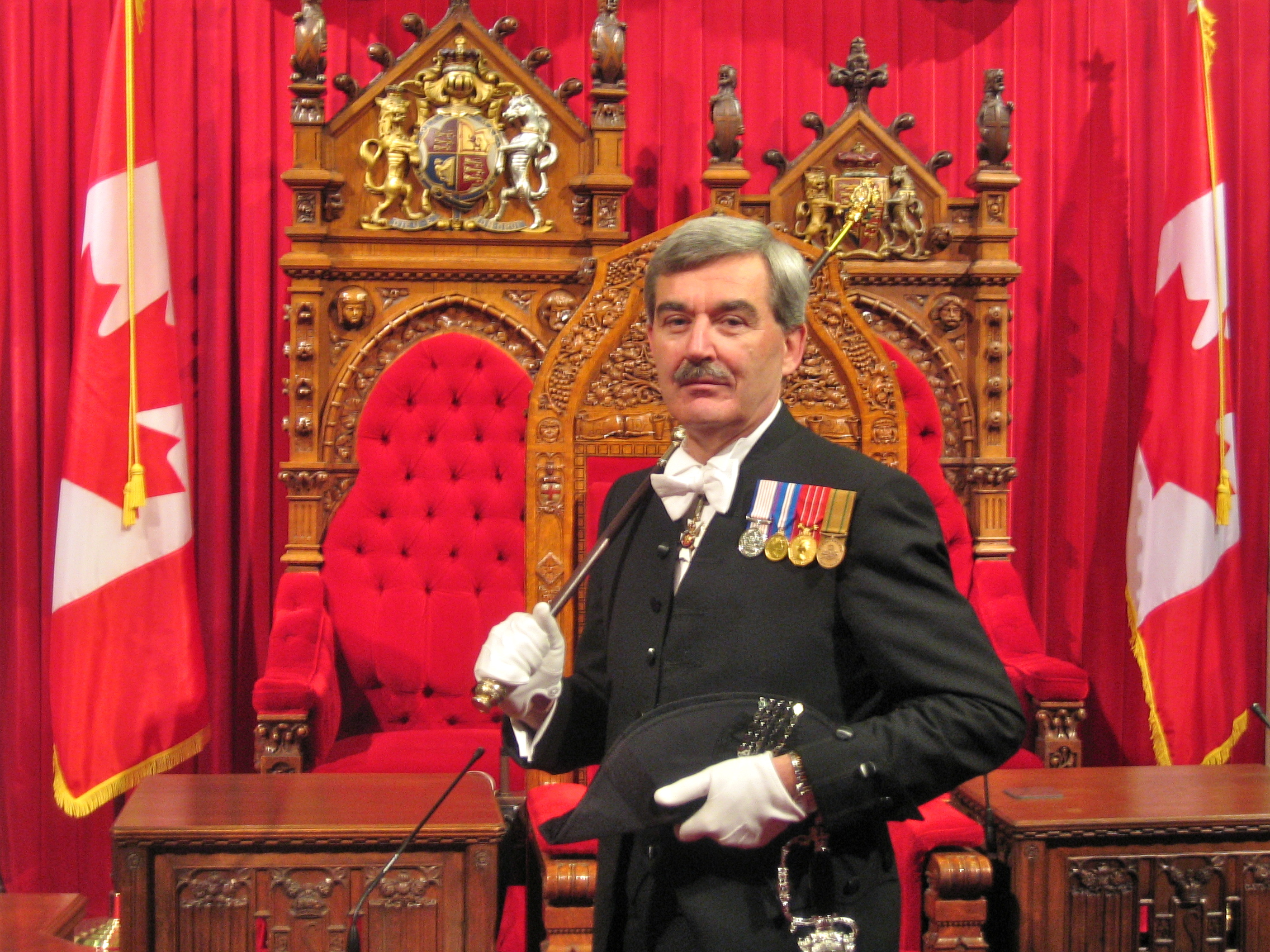
Kevin MacLeod, the former Canadian Usher of the Black Rod, stands in front of the 1878 Senate thrones

The Usher of the Black Rod for the Senate of Canada is the equivalent to the Black Rod office for the House of Lords. The position was also known as the Gentleman Usher of the Black Rod until 1997, when the appointment of the first female Black Rod prompted the word gentleman to be dropped from the title.

The provincial legislatures of Saskatchewan, British Columbia, Alberta, New Brunswick, and Prince Edward Island have also incorporated the position of the Black Rods into their respective parliamentary systems. In Quebec, the dissolution of the Legislative Council in 1968 resulted in the abolition of the post in that province.

=== Cook Islands ===
In the Cook Islands the Usher of the Black Rod is the messenger of the King's Representative at the ceremonial opening of parliament.

In 2023, the Cook Islands adopted a black rod (Cook Islands Māori: Te Mato Mana) carved from mato wood salvaged from the gallery of the Ziona Tapu Church in Avarua. The black rod was designed by Tangata Vainerere, the clerk of the Cook Islands parliament, and carved by Wireless Tomokino. The piece of wood it was carved from is thought to be over 160 years old. It was first used at the ceremonial opening of the 18th parliament on 22 March 2023.

=== Ireland ===
In the Kingdom of Ireland, the Parliament of Ireland was modelled on the English Parliament. In the Irish House of Lords, "the gentleman ussher to the lord chauncellor" is mentioned in 1586, the "Gentleman-Usher" and "Yeoman-Usher" in 1634, and the "Gentleman-Usher of the Black-Rod" in 1646, when Black Rod disputed with the Keeper of the King's Robes as to which had the right to appoint the Yeoman Usher, and the Lords ruled that it should be Black Rod, because that was the case in England. Andrew Fountaine received £200 for attending the whole of the 1707 session, £50 more than "the last Gentleman-Usher attending but a Part of a Session". The post was in the gift of the Lord Lieutenant of Ireland, and generally given at the start of a parliamentary session; these lasted several months and were initially held irregularly, later every two years, and finally every year. In 1765, the Marquess of Hertford moved from minister in France to viceroy in Dublin, and offered his secretary David Hume the post of Black Rod, suggesting that from the annual fees of £800–£900, he could employ a deputy for £300; Hume declined the offer. The Irish Black Rod became Usher of the Order of St Patrick upon its establishment in 1783. The Acts of Union 1800, in uniting Ireland with the Kingdom of Great Britain to form the United Kingdom of Great Britain and Ireland, abolished the Irish Parliament and its House of Lords, but the Order of St Patrick continued, and so did the office of Black Rod/Usher. The holder in 1800, Thomas Lindsay, received £845 8s 11d compensation for the loss of income from Lords fees. With the creation of the Irish Free State in 1922, the Order of St Patrick fall into disuse and no Black Rod was appointed thereafter.

- 1634: Darcy Wentworth of Brodsworth
- 1646: Stephen Smith, Esq.
- 1662, 1666: Robert Hall, Esq.
- 1692: Thomas Carter, Esq.
- 1695: Ralph Bucknall, Esq.
- 1696: William Berrow, Esq.
- March 1697: Bartholemew Mahan, Esq.
- June 1697: Andrew Loyd, Esq.
- 1703: Humphry Gore
- February 1704: Maurice Birchfield
- 1707: Sir Andrew Fountaine
- 5 May 1709: Thomas Ellys
- 20 May 1709: Thomas Paget
- 1711: Brinsley Butler (Baron Newtown-Butler from 1724, Viscount Lanesborough from 1728)
- 1715, 1717: John Tichborne
- 1719: Robert Parsons
- September 1721: William Fisher, Esq.
- November 1721, 1723: Captain Francis Boggust, Esq.
- 1725, 1727, 1729: Michael Broughton
  - 1725, 1729: Colonel Edward Richbell (during absences of Michael Broughton)
- 1731, 1733: Sir Multon Lambart
- 1735: William Champneis, Esq.
- 1737, 1739, 1741: Henry Cavendish, Esq.
- 1743: Robert Langrishe
- 1745: Solomon Dayrolles
- 1747, 1749: The Hon. William FitzWilliam
- 1751, 1753: William James, Esq. of Ightham, Kent
- 1755: Henry Cavendish
- September 1757: James Gisborne
- September 1757: Hon. Edward Stopford
- October 1757: James Moore
- 1759: John Marsh Dickinson
- 1761: George Montagu
- 1763: Archibald Edmonstone
- 1765 Edward Colman
- 1767, 1769: Bowen Southwell
- 1773, 1774: Robert Weston
- 1776: Francis James Buchanan
- 1777–September 1780: Hon. Henry Hobart
- October 1780: John Lees (later 1st Baronet)
- October 1781: Andrew Corbett
- 1782: Thomas Hussey
- February 1783: John Freemantle
- October 1783: Sir Willoughby Ashton
- February 1784: Colonel Andrew Barnard
- April 1784, 1785: George Bernard
- 1787, 1788, 1789: Scrope Bernard, Esq. (later Scrope Bernard-Morland)
- 1790, 1793: Hon. Henry Fane
- January 1795: Thomas Hussey
- May 1795, 1797: Nicholas Price
- 1798–1806: Thomas Lindsay
- 1806–1835: Sir Charles Hawley Vernon
- 1835–1838: Major Sir Francis Charles Stanhope
- 1838–1841: Sir William Edward Leeson
- 1841–1858: Lieutenant Colonel Sir George Morris
- 1858–1878: Sir George Burdett L'Estrange
- 1879–1913: Colonel James Caulfeild, 7th Viscount Charlemont
- 1915–1917: Sir John Olphert
- 1918–1933: Sir Samuel Murray Power

=== New Zealand ===
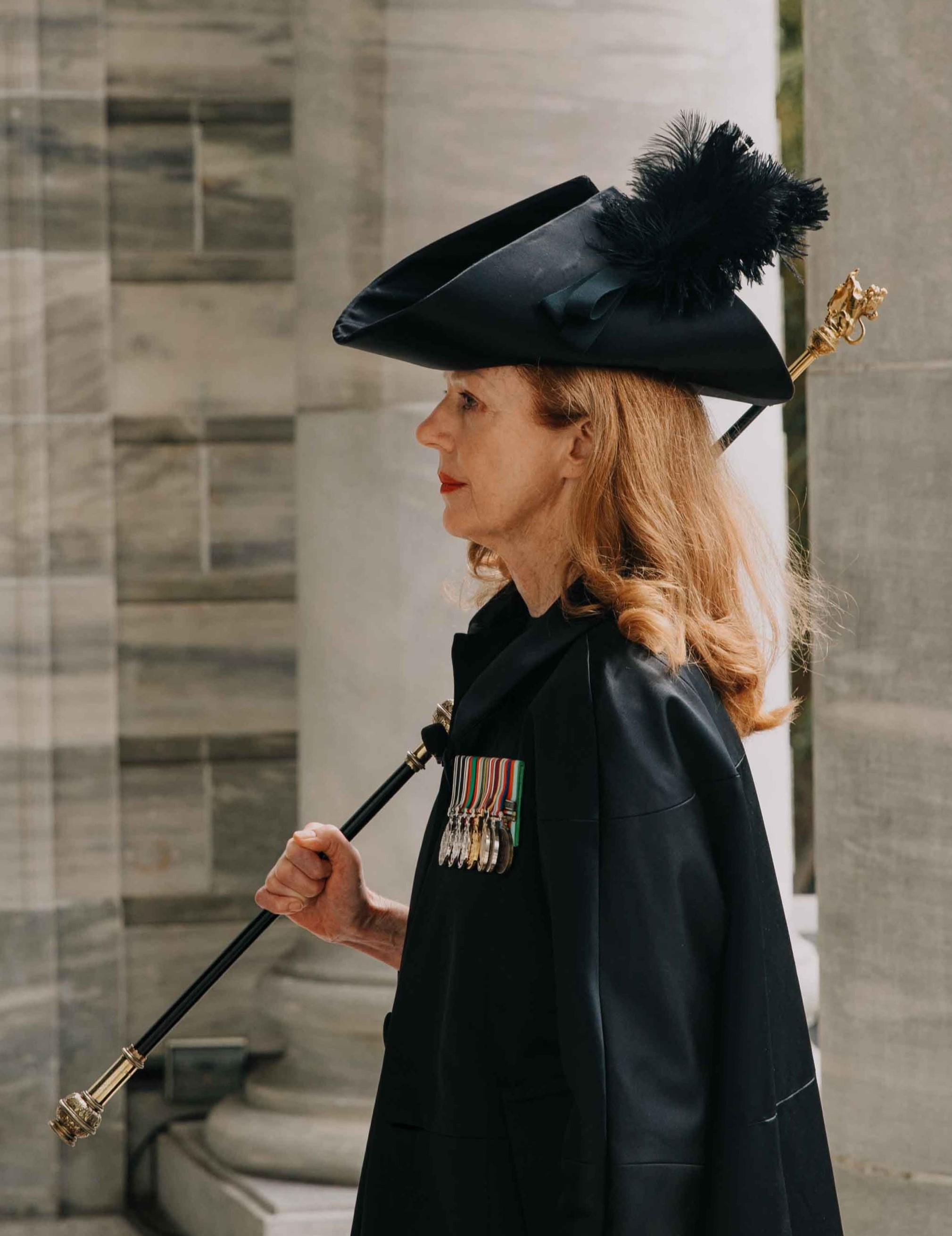
Usher of the Black Rod Sandra McKie at the State Opening of the New Zealand Parliament in 2023

In New Zealand, where the Legislative Council was abolished in 1951, the Usher of the Black Rod continues to summon MPs to the chamber for the Throne Speech. It is not a full-time position.

Arthur Bothamley was the first person to hold the role; he was usher of the black rod for 45 years from 1892 until August 1937. In September 1937, he was succeeded by Captain Douglas Bryan, who retired in June 1957. John Everitt Seal took over from Bryan in June 1957 and held the role until his death on 1 November 1964. Alexander John Mackay Manson was appointed in May 1965 to succeed Seal in time for the opening of the second term of the 34th New Zealand Parliament later that month. Manson retired in June 1971. In May 1972, Melville Harvey Scott Innes-Jones was appointed to succeed Manson. Innes-Jones retired in 1991.

William Nathan, appointed in 1993, was the first Māori Gentleman Usher of the Black Rod. Colonel Nathan retired in 2005, and was followed by David Baguley. David Williams was appointed as the acting Usher of the Black Rod in 2017 for the opening of the 52nd New Zealand Parliament. Sandra McKie was appointed to act in the role in 2020 for the opening of the 53rd Parliament, the first woman to hold the position. McKie was permanently appointed to the role effective from 17 October 2022, following the formal retirement of Baguley.

The ceremonial black rod was presented to Parliament by Governor-General Charles Bathurst, 1st Viscount Bledisloe in January, 1931. Made of polished black ebony, it is topped by a golden lion rampant holding a shield bearing the royal cypher of King George V and has a 1931 gold sovereign set in its base. Due to the fragility of the original 1931 black rod, a regular black baton acting as a black rod is now used during the official openings of Parliament.

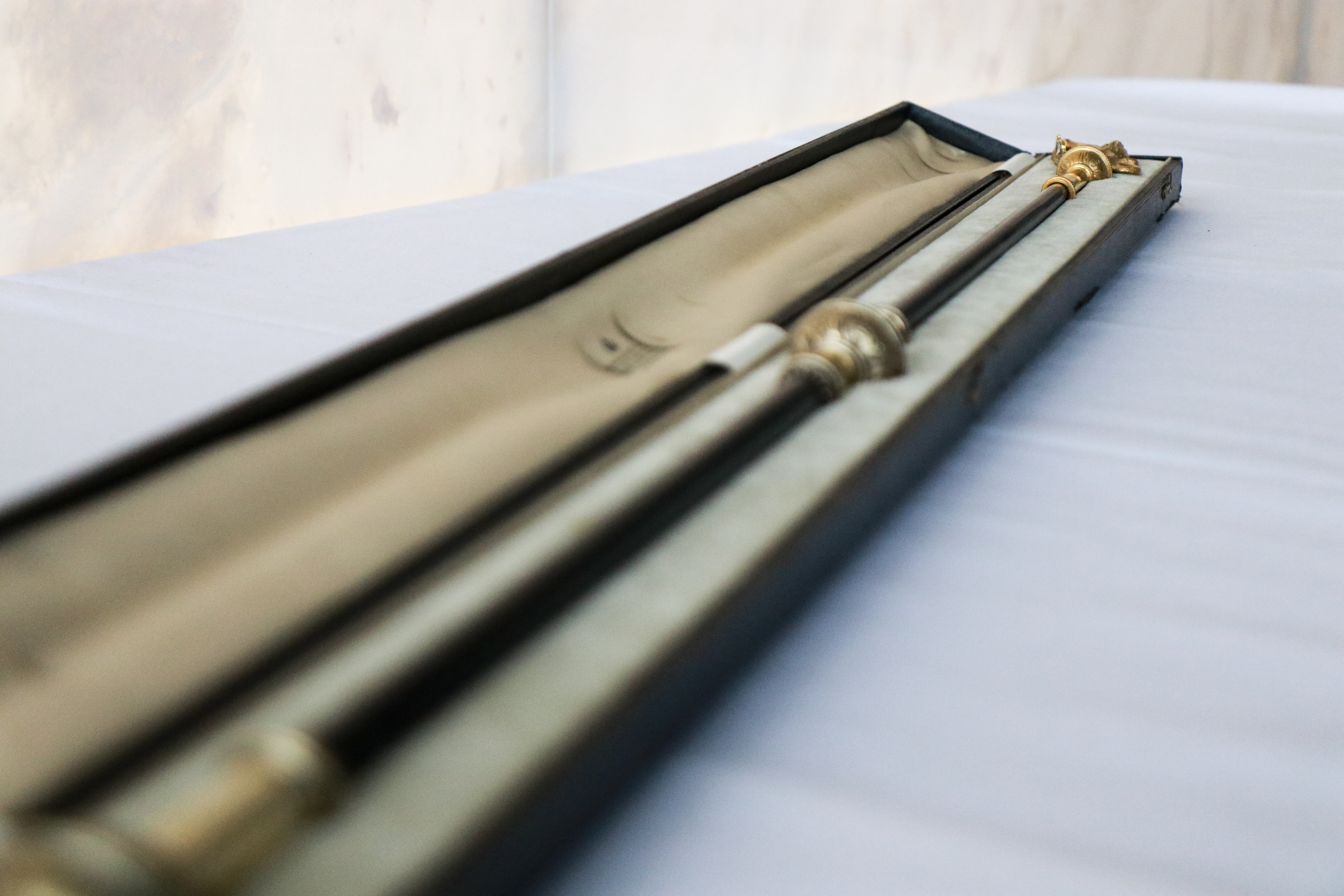
The ceremonial black rod of New Zealand in a case

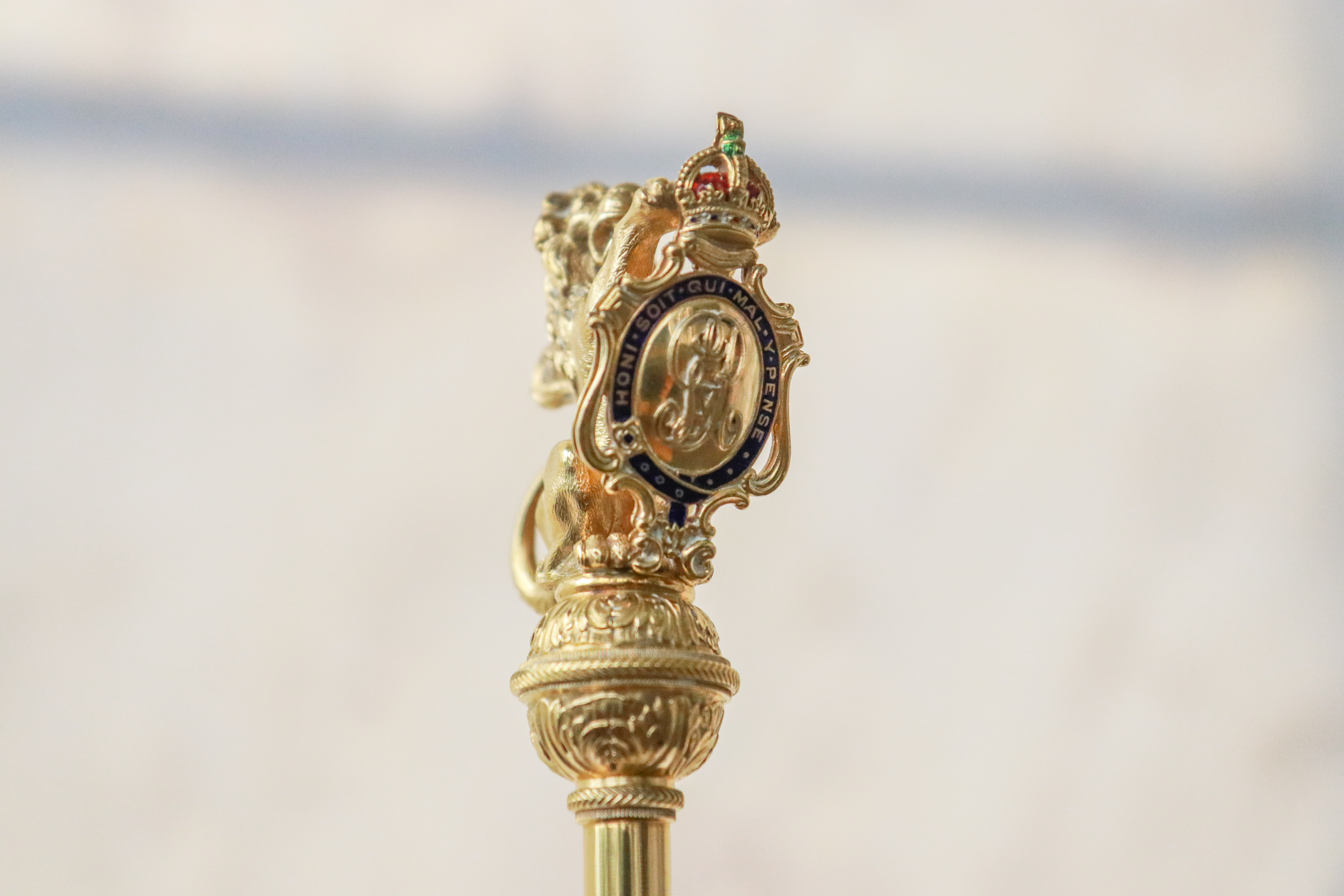
Detail of the top of the ceremonial black rod

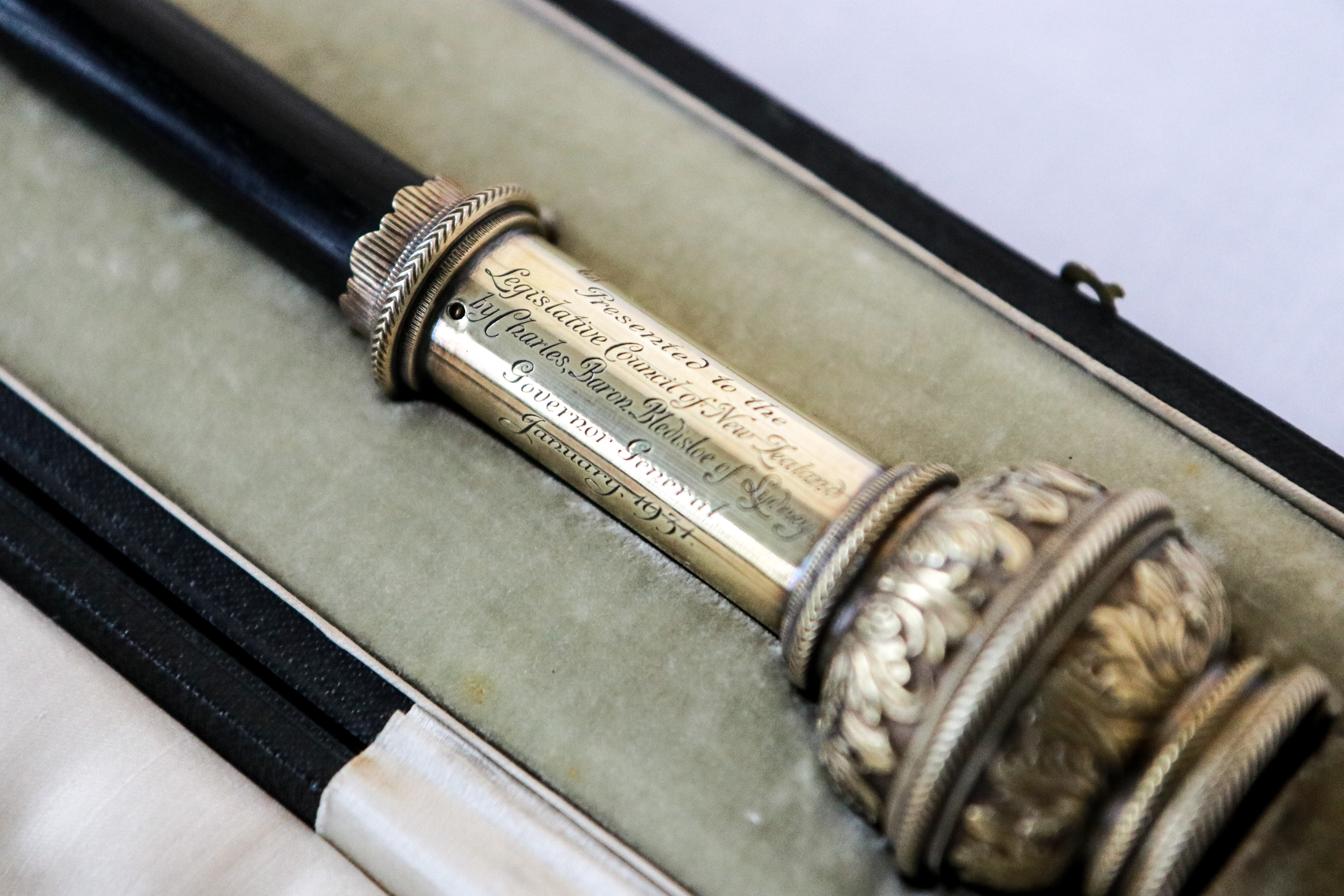
Inscription on the base of the ceremonial black rod

=== South Africa ===
The Senate of South Africa had a Gentleman Usher of the Black Rod from its inception in 1910 to abolition in 1980. When the Senate was restored in 1994 the renamed position of Usher of the Black Rod returned with it, continuing in the new National Council of Provinces.

== Related ushers ==
Before the Acts of Union 1707 united the English and Scottish parliaments, there was a Heritable Usher of the White Rod who had a similar role in the Estates of Parliament in Scotland. This office is currently held by John Armes, Bishop of Edinburgh, but the role carries no duties.

Gentleman ushers exist for all the British orders of chivalry, and are coloured as follows:

- The Gentleman Usher of the Black Rod – Most Noble Order of the Garter
- The Gentleman Usher of the Green Rod – Most Ancient and Most Noble Order of the Thistle
- The Gentleman Usher of the Scarlet Rod – Most Honourable Order of the Bath
- The Gentleman Usher of the Blue Rod – Most Distinguished Order of Saint Michael and Saint George
- The Gentleman Usher of the Purple Rod – Most Excellent Order of the British Empire

== Sources ==
- Bond, Maurice (1976). The Gentleman Usher of the Black Rod. London: HMSO. ISBN 978-0-11-700567-9 – via Open Library.
- Johnston-Liik, Edith Mary, ed. (2002). History of the Irish Parliament 1692–1800: Commons, Constituencies and Statutes. Belfast: Ulster Historical Foundation. ISBN 9781903688717.
