= Serengeti volcanic grasslands =

Tropical grassland ecoregion of Tanzania

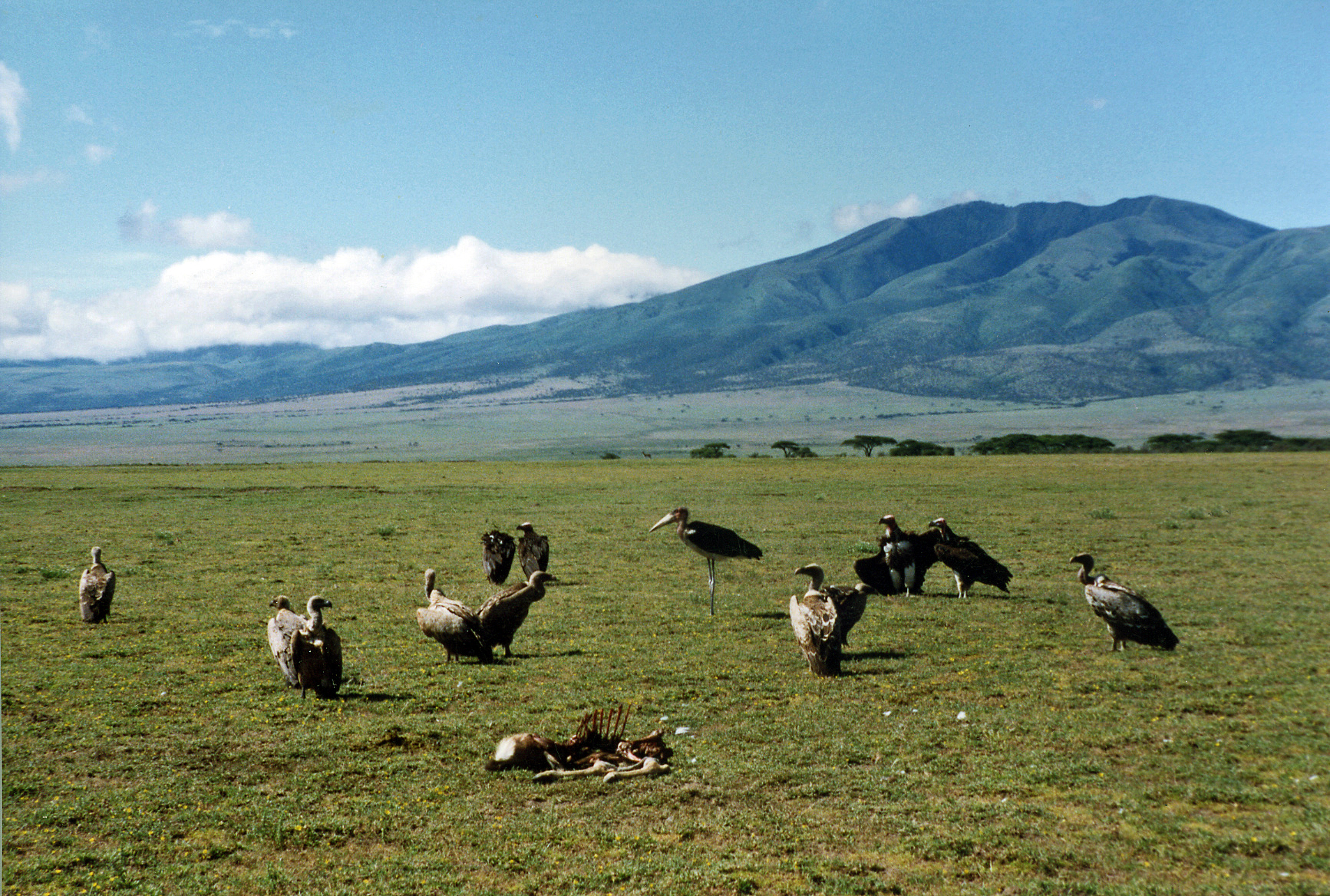
- Vultures in Serengeti National Park

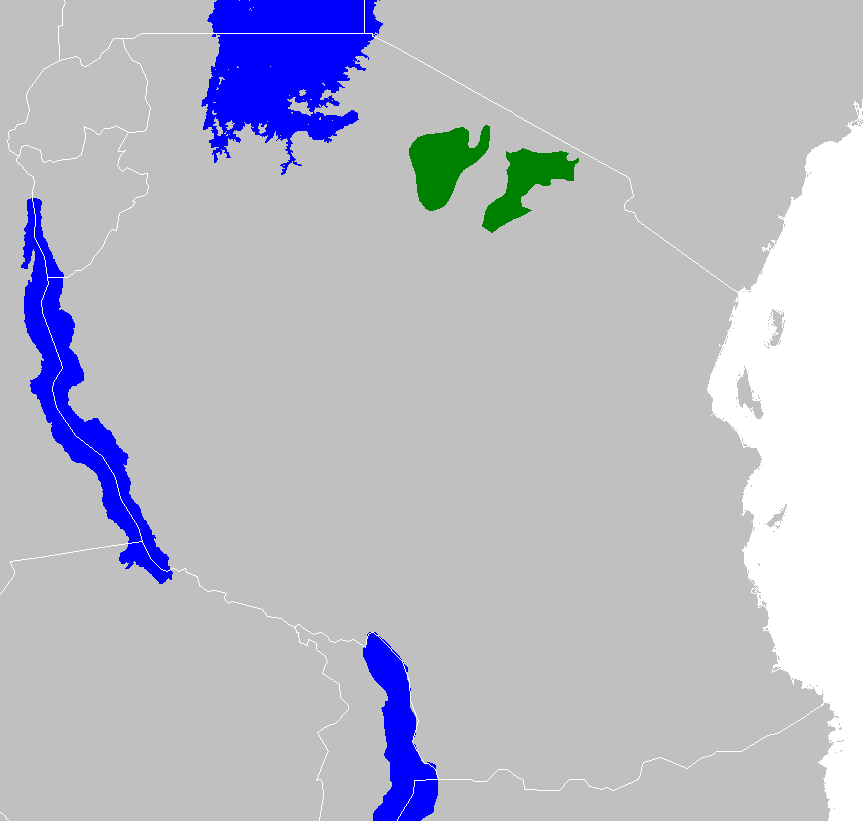
- Map of Serengeti volcanic grasslands ecoregion

Ecology
- Realm: Afrotropic
- Biome: Tropical and subtropical grasslands, savannas, and shrublands

Geography
- Area: 17,900 km^{2} (6,900 sq mi)
- Country: Tanzania
- Coordinates: 3°S 36.2°E

Conservation
- Conservation status: vulnerable

The Serengeti volcanic grasslands is a tropical grassland ecoregion of Tanzania. The Serengeti volcanic grasslands are distinctive grasslands growing on deposits of volcanic ash in northern Tanzania. It includes the eastern portion of Serengeti National Park and areas south and east of the Ngorongoro Highlands.

== Topography ==
The Serengeti volcanic grasslands are an edaphic plant community that grows on soils derived from volcanic ash. The eruption of the now-extinct Kerimasi volcano 150,000 years ago deposited huge amounts of fine whitish-grey ash. More recent eruptions of the Ol Doinyo Lengai volcano deepened the ash deposits. These ash deposits hardened with time, creating layers of calcareous tuff and calcitic hard-pan soil. The flat or slightly undulating plains are interrupted here and there by rocky kopjes, outcrops of the underlying Precambrian rocks. The terrain lies at a mean altitude of 1,438 metres (4,718 ft), rising to a maximum of 2,804 metres (9,199 ft).

== Climate ==
The climate of the ecoregion is Oceanic climate, subtropical highland variety (Köppen climate classification (Cwb)). This climate has cool summers and cool, but not cold, winters. It is usually associated with coastal areas in mid-latitudes, but is also experienced at higher altitudes inland. Temperatures and precipitation are relatively even throughout the year, with no month averaging below 0 °C (32 °F), and no month averaging above 22 °C (72 °F).

== Flora and fauna ==
The terrain is 52% herbaceous vegetation including grasses, 26% low shrubs, 11% cultivated agricultural land, and the remainder is open woodland and wetlands. Characteristic grass species include Andropogon greenwayi, Chloris gayana (Rhodes grass), Cynodon dactylon (Bermuda grass), Digitaria macroblephara, Eragrostis tenuifolia (Elastic grass), Eustachys paspaloides (Fan grass), Microchloa kunthii (Kunth's smallgrass), Panicum coloratum (Coloured Guinea grass), Pennisetum mezianum, Pennisetum stramineum, Sporobolus ioclados (Pan dropseed), and Themeda triandra (Red grass).

== Protected areas ==
Approximately 86% of the ecoregion is under some form of protected area status, including:

- Serengeti National Park
- Lake Manyara National Park
- Ngorongoro Conservation Area
