= Laetoli =

National Historic Site of Tanzania

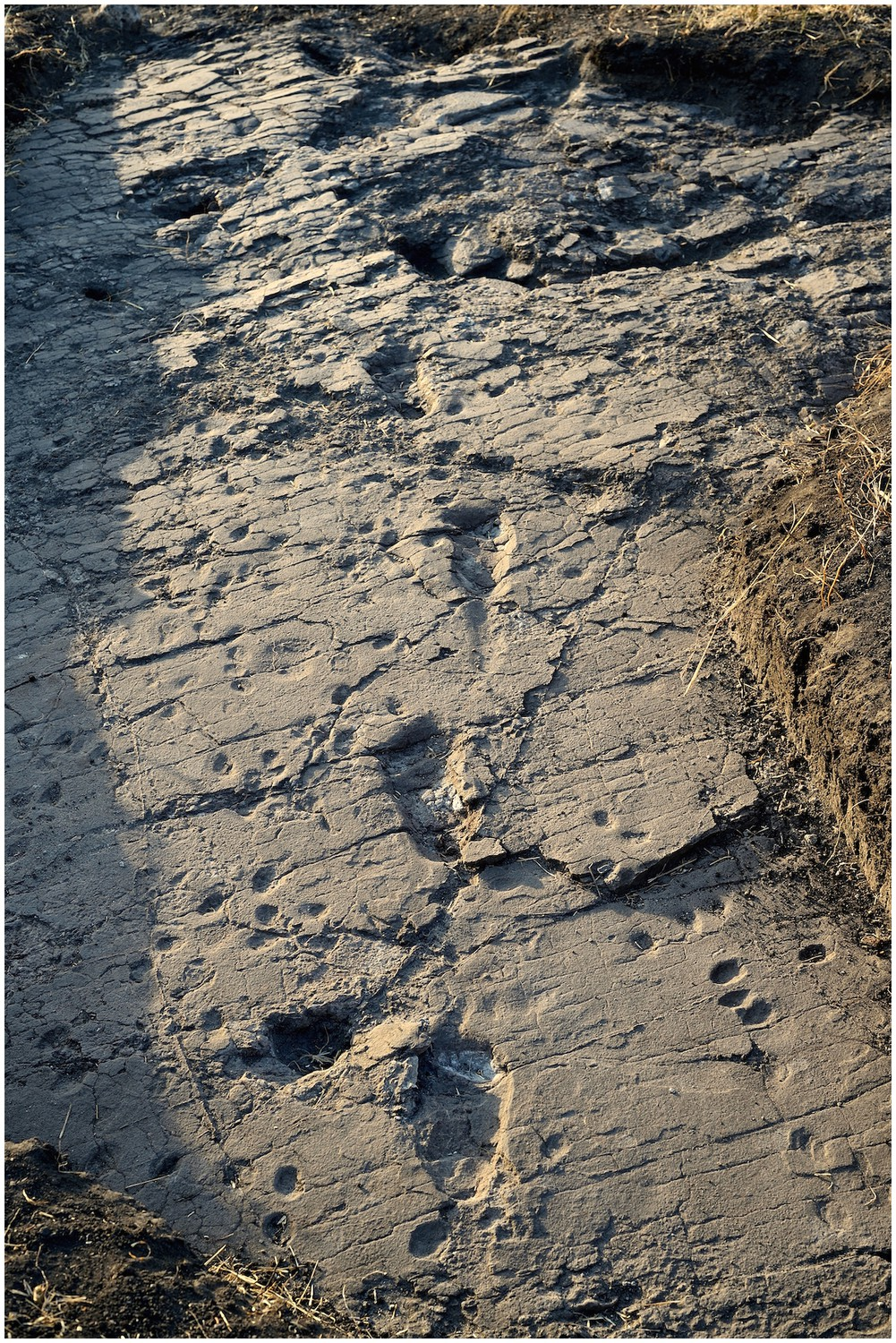
- Hominid footprints at site S in Laetoli

- Site location in Tanzania
- 2°59′46.39″S 35°21′8.64″E
- Type: Archaeological
- Location: Monduli District, Arusha Region, Tanzania
- Region: Eastern Africa

Site notes
- Area: 20 km^{2} (215,278,208 sq ft)
- Archaeologists: Mary Leakey
- Condition: Excavated
- Owner: Tanzanian Government
- Management: Antiquities Division, Ministry of Natural Resources and Tourism
- Public access: Yes

National Historic Sites of Tanzania
- Official name: Laetoli Footprints
- Type: Pre-historic

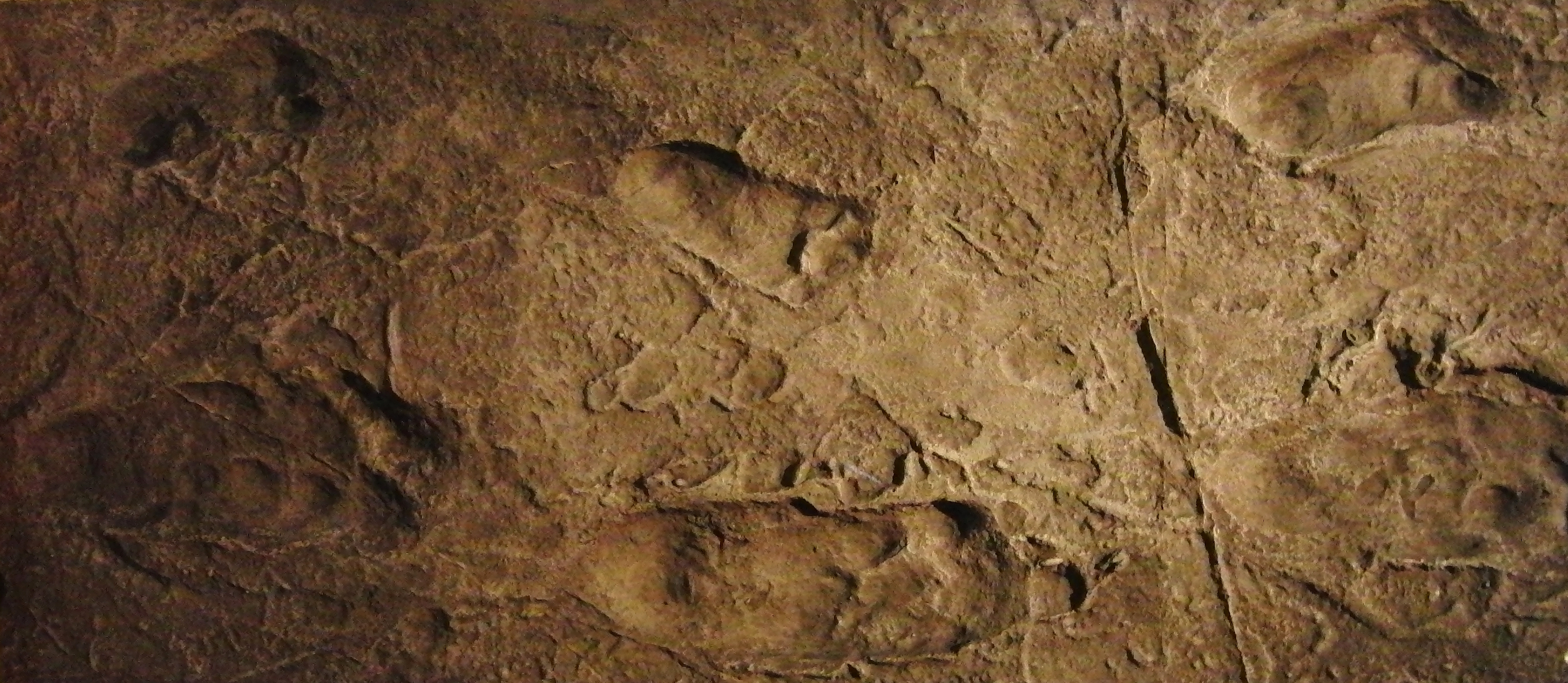
Replica of Laetoli footprints, exhibit in the National Museum of Nature and Science, Tokyo, Japan

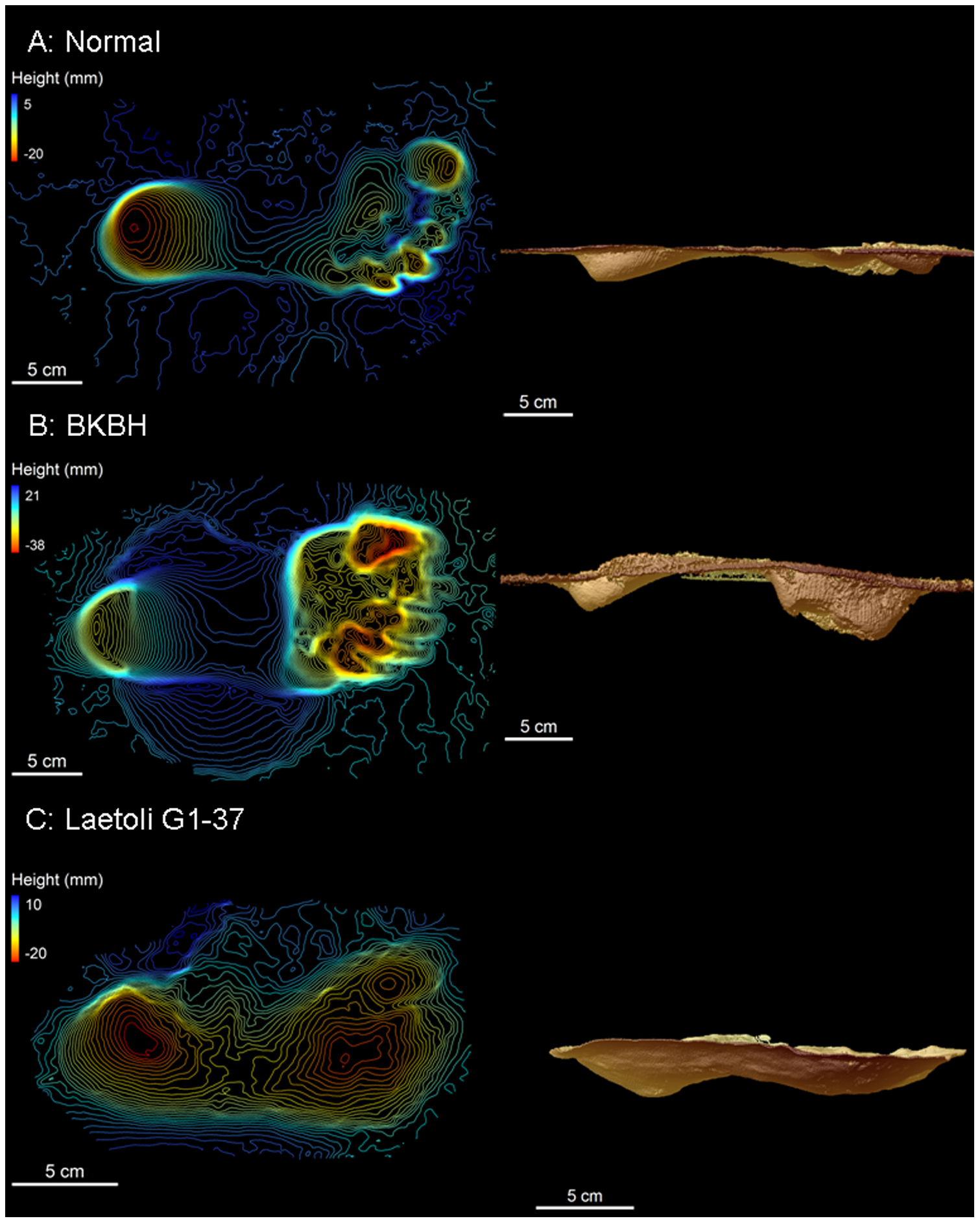
Laetoli footprints

Laetoli is a pre-historic site located in Enduleni ward of Ngorongoro District in Arusha Region, Tanzania. The site is dated to the Plio-Pleistocene and famous for its Hominina footprints, preserved in volcanic ash. The site of the Laetoli footprints (Site G) is located 45 km south of Olduvai Gorge. The location and tracks were discovered by paleoanthropologist Mary Leakey and her team in 1976, and were excavated by 1978. Based on analysis of the footfall impressions "The Laetoli Footprints" provided convincing evidence for the theory of bipedalism in Pliocene Hominina and received significant recognition by scientists and the public. Since 1998, paleontological expeditions have continued under the leadership of Amandus Kwekason of the National Museum of Tanzania and Terry Harrison of New York University, leading to the recovery of more than a dozen new Hominina finds, as well as a comprehensive reconstruction of the paleoecology. The site is a registered National Historic Sites of Tanzania.

Dated to 3.7 million years ago, they were the oldest known evidence of hominin bipedalism at that time. Subsequently, older Ardipithecus ramidus fossils were found with features that suggest bipedalism. With the footprints there were other discoveries excavated at Laetoli including Hominina and animal skeletal remains. Analysis of the footprints and skeletal structure showed clear evidence that bipedalism preceded enlarged brains in Hominina. At a species level, the identity of the Hominina who made the trace is difficult to construe precisely; Australopithecus afarensis is the species most commonly proposed.

== Background ==
=== History of research ===
Hominin timeline
| ← / Earlier apes; ← / Gorilla split; ← / Chimpanzee split; ← / Earliest bipedal; ← / Earliest sign of Ardipithecus; ← / Earliest sign of Australopithecus; ← / Earliest stone tools; ← / Earliest sign of Homo; ← / Dispersal beyond Africa; ← / Earliest fire / cooking; ← / Earliest rock art; ← / Earliest clothes; ← / Modern humans |
(million years ago)

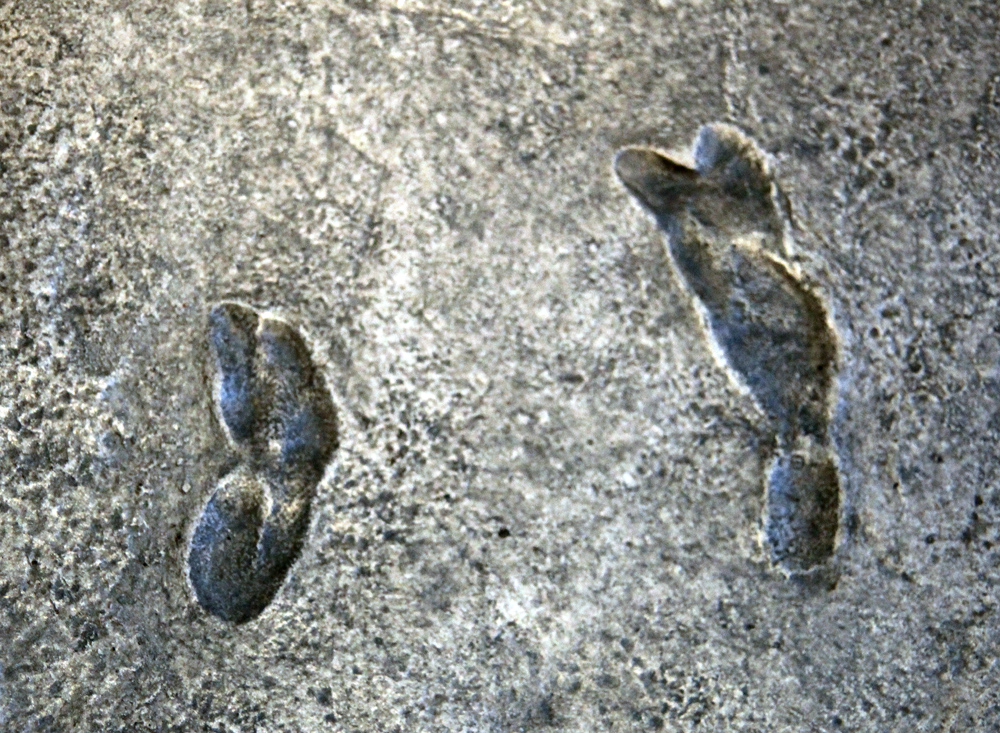
Cast of the Laetoli footprints, on display in the Hall of Human Origins in the Smithsonian Institution's National Museum of Natural History in Washington, D.C.

Laetoli was first recognized by western science in 1935 through a man named Sanimu, who persuaded archeologist Louis Leakey to investigate the area. Several mammalian fossils were collected with a left lower canine tooth originally identified as that of a non-human primate, but later was revealed (in 1979, by P. Andrews and T. White) as the site's first fossil hominin.

In 1938 and 1939, German archaeologist Ludwig Kohl-Larsen studied the site extensively. Several hominin remains, including premolars, molars, and incisors, were identified. A later excavation in 1959 revealed no new hominins, and Laetoli went relatively unexplored until 1974—when the discovery of a hominin premolar by George Dove revived interest in the site. Mary Leakey returned and almost immediately discovered the well-preserved remains of hominins. In 1978, Leakey's 1976 discovery of hominin tracks—"The Laetoli Footprints"—provided convincing evidence of bipedalism in Pliocene hominins and gained significant recognition by both scientists and laymen.

=== Possible tracemaker ===
Although much debated, researchers have tentatively concluded that Australopithecus afarensis is the species of the three hominins who made the footprints at Laetoli. This conclusion is based on the reconstruction of the foot skeleton of a female A. afarensis hominin by anthropologists Tim D. White and Gen Suwa of the University of California, as well as detailed footprint analysis by Russel Tuttle of the University of Chicago; he compared human and other bipedal animals such as bears and primates, including gaits and foot structure, and taking into account the use of footwear. For gait Tuttle looked at the step length, stride length, stride width, and foot angle, and determined that A. afarensis was more human-like in gait than ape-like.

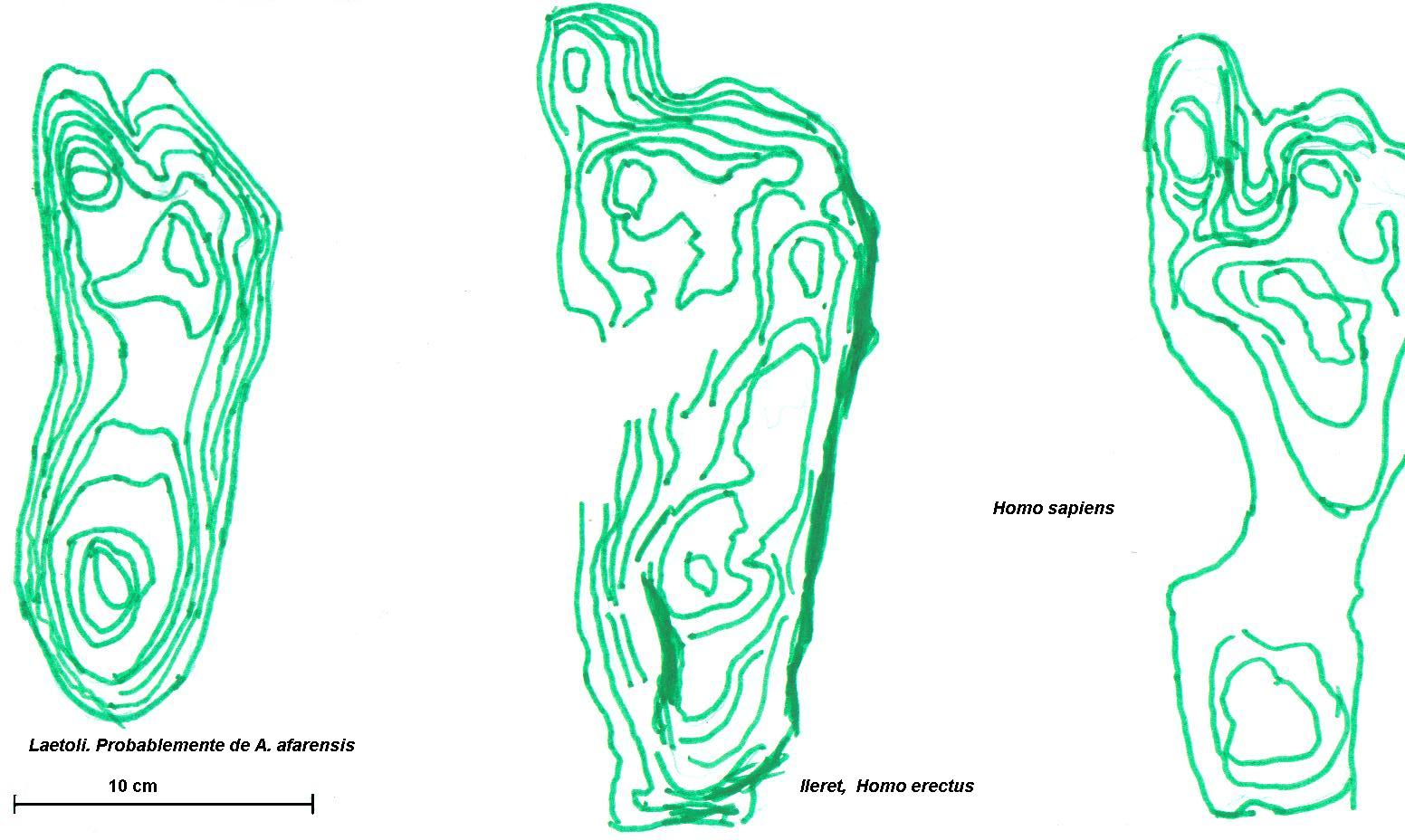
Interpretation of a diagramatics o Human footprint in Laetoli (3.7 My) thought to be from A. afarensis; Ileret (1.5 My), from H. erectus, and H. sapiens. The green lines represent the points under the same pressure/weight.

A. afarensis is an obligate bipedal hominin with the beginnings of sexual dimorphism attributed to its species, and brain size very similar to that of modern chimpanzees and gorillas. Analysis of the Laetoli footprints indicated the characteristics of obligate bipedalism: pronounced heel strike from deep impressions, lateral transmission of force from the heel to the base of the lateral metatarsal, a well-developed medial longitudinal arch, adducted big toe, and a deep impression for the big toe commensurate with toe-off.

=== Age and dating techniques ===
Two dating techniques were used to arrive at the approximate age of the beds that make up the ground layers at Laetoli: potassium-argon dating and analysis of stratigraphy. Based on these methods, the layers have been named as follows, starting with the deepest: Lower Laetolil Beds, Upper Laetolil Beds, Lower Ndolanya Beds, Upper Ndolanya Beds, Ogol lavas, Naibadad Beds, Olpiro Beds, and Ngaloba Beds; it is the ancient Laetolil Beds that contain the footprints trackway. The upper unit of the Laetolil Beds dated back 3.6 to 3.8 million years ago. The beds are dominantly tuffs and have a maximum thickness of 130 meters. No mammalian fauna were found in the lower unit of the Laetolil Beds, and no date could be assigned to this layer.

The Ndolanya Beds, which are located above the Laetolil Beds and underlie the Ogol lavas, are clearly divisible into upper and lower units separated by a widespread deposit of calcrete up to one meter thick. However, like the Lower Laetolil Beds, no date can be assigned to the Ndolanya Beds. The Ogol lavas date back 2.4 million years. No fauna or artifacts are known from the Naibadad Beds, but they are correlated with a bed layer at Olduvai Gorge based on mineral content. Pleistocene fauna and Acheulean artifacts have been found in the Olpiro Beds. Based on a trachytic tuff which occurs within the beds, the Ngaloba Beds may therefore be dated between 120,000 and 150,000 years BP.

== Discoveries ==
=== Hominina footprints from site G ===
The principal discovery, made by Mary Leakey and her team in 1976 (and fully excavated by 1978), is a 75-foot (24-meter) line of Hominina fossil footprints, preserved in powdery volcanic ash originally thought to have been from an eruption of the nearby (20 km) Sadiman volcano. However, recent study of the Sadiman volcano has shown that it is not a source for the Laetoli Footprints Tuff (Zaitsev et al. 2011). Soft rain cemented the ash layer (15 cm thick) to tuff without destroying the prints. In time, they were covered by other ash deposits.

The fossil footprints were rather whimsically discovered by Yale's Andrew Hill when visiting Mary Leakey in 1976. While walking back to camp one evening, Hill fell trying to avoid a large ball of elephant dung thrown at him by a colleague. With his face only inches from the rock, he recognized footprints made by antelopes and rhinos preserved in the volcanic ash, and among these, hominid footprints.

The Hominina prints were produced by three individuals, one walking in the footprints of the other, making the preceding footprints difficult to recover. As the tracks lead in the same direction, they might have been produced by a group visiting a waterhole together, but there is nothing—or very little (see below, Interpretation and significance)—to support the common assumption of a nuclear family.

Roberto Sáez claims that this 27-metre trail of about 70 footprints was left by two Australopithecus walking in front, while the third hominid walked behind, superimposing its steps on the footprints left by one of the two in front. He acknowledges that it will never be possible to prove that this is true.

| | Hominina 1 | Hominina 2 |
|---|---|---|
| length of footprint | 21.5 cm | 18.5 cm |
| width of footprint | 10 cm | 8.8 cm |
| length of pace | 47.2 cm | 28.7 cm |
| reconstructed body-size | 1.34-1.56 m | 1.15-1.34 m |

The footprints demonstrate that the Hominina habitually walked upright as there are no knuckle-impressions. The feet do not have the mobile big toe of apes; instead, they have an arch (the bending of the sole of the foot) typical of modern humans. The hominins seem to have moved in a leisurely stroll.

Computer simulations based on information from A. afarensis fossil skeletons and the spacing of the footprints indicate that the Hominina were walking at 1.0 m/s or above, which matches human walking speeds. The results of other studies have also supported the theory of a human-like gait.

=== Hominina footprints from site S ===
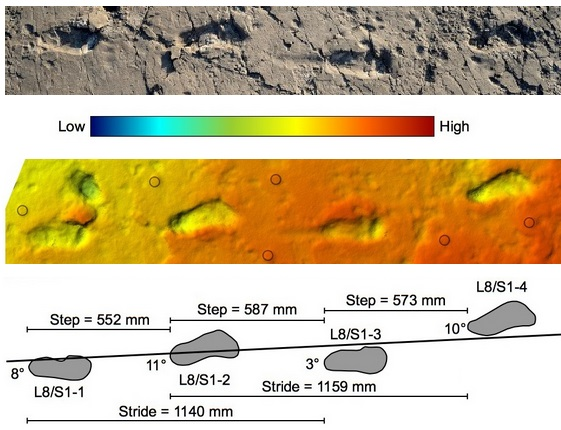
Footprints from Laetoli reported in 2016

In 2015, footprints of the same age as the first reported footprints were unearthed at a site approximately 150 meters south of the original site G footprint site. This site is called site S, and the 2 individuals who made the prints are named S1 and S2. S2 is represented by only 1 print, but S1 left a track of prints, the first 4 of which are shown in the composite image, along with an analysis of step and stride lengths. Further analysis indicated that individual S1 was considerably larger than any of the three individuals from site G.

=== Other footprints and artefacts ===
Other prints show the presence of twenty different animal species besides the hominin A. afarensis, among them hyenas, wild cats (Machairodus), baboons, wild boars, giraffes, gazelles, rhinos, several kinds of antelope, Hipparion, buffaloes, elephant relatives (of the extinct genus Deinotherium), hares and birds. Rain-prints can be seen as well. Few footprints are superimposed, which indicates that they were rapidly covered up. Most of the animals are represented by skeletal remains discovered in the area.

No artefacts have been found in the vicinity, at least within the ancient Laetoli Beds that contain the trackway. However, artefacts from the younger Olpiro and Ngaloba Beds, also preserved at Laetoli, have been found.

== Interpretation and significance ==
Before the discovery of the Laetoli footprints, there was much debate as to which developed first in the human evolutionary time line: a larger brain or bipedalism. The discovery of these footprints settled the issue, proving that the Laetoli hominins were fully bipedal long before the evolution of the modern human brain, and were bipedal close to a million years before the earliest known stone tools were made. The footprints were classified as possibly belonging to Australopithecus afarensis.

Some analysts have noted in their interpretations that the smaller trail bears "telltale signs that suggest whoever left the prints was burdened on one side." This may suggest that a female was carrying an infant on her hip but this cannot be proven for certain.

The footprints themselves were an unlikely discovery because they closely resemble modern human footprints, despite being almost 4 million years old. It is noted that the toe pattern is much the same as the human foot, which is much different from the feet of chimpanzees and other non-bipedal beings. The footprint impression has been interpreted as the same as the modern human stride, with the heel striking first and then a weight transfer to the ball of the foot before pushing off the toes.

Based on stratigraphic analysis, the findings also provide insight into the climate at the time of the making of the footprints. Pliocene sediments show that the environment was more moist and productive than now. Climate changes that caused a shift from forest to grassland environments have a strong correlation with upright posture and bipedalism in hominins. This could have initiated the evolution to bipedalism of the hominins found at Laetoli.

== Preservation and conservation ==
In 1979, after the Laetoli footprints were recorded, they were re-buried as a then-novel way of preservation. The site was re-vegetated by acacia trees, which later gave rise to fears over root growth. In mid-1992, a GCI-Tanzanian team investigated this by opening a three-by-three meter trench, which showed that roots had damaged the footprints. However, the part of the trackway unaffected by root growth showed exceptional preservation. The success of the experiment led to an increased practice in reburials for preserving excavated sites.

In 1993, measures were taken to prevent erosion. The original trackway was remolded and new casts were made. As the trackway is very fragile, the new replica cast was used to guide re-excavation in the field. A team of specialists, one being Fiona Marshall, re-excavated half of the trackway to record its condition, stabilize the surface, extract dead roots and rebury it with synthetic geotextile materials. This allows the trackway surface to breathe, and protects it against root growth.

Proposals for lifting the track and moving it to an enclosed site have been suggested, but the cost is viewed as outweighing the benefits: the process would require much research, a large amount of money, and there is a risk of loss or damage. Thus, burial seems to be the most effective method of preservation.

== See also ==
- Ancient footprints of Acahualinca – late Holocene human footprints found near the shore of Lake Managua in Nicaragua, dating to approximately 2,120 years ago.
- Eve's footprint – footprints of a single female found at Langebaan, South Africa in 1995, dating to approximately 117,000 years ago.
- Happisburgh footprints – early Pleistocene fossilized hominid footprints found in a sediment layer on a beach at Happisburgh in Norfolk, England, dating to more than 800,000 years ago,
- Ileret – footprints of Homo erectus found at Ileret, Northern Kenya, dating to approximately 1.5 million years ago.
- List of fossil sites (with link directory)
- List of hominina (hominid) fossils (with images)

== Bibliography ==
- Archaeologyinfo.com (n.d.) Australopithecus afarensis. Retrieved from http://archaeologyinfo.com/australopithecus-afarensis/
- Ditchfield, P. & Harrison, T. (2011). Sedimentology, Lithostratigraphy and Depositional History of the Laetoli Area. In T. Harrison (Ed.), Paleontology and Geology of Laetoli: Human Evolution in Context: Geology, Geochronology, Paleoecology and Paleoenvironment, Vertebrate Paelobiology and Paleoanthropology. 1, pp. 47–76, Dordrecht, Netherlands: Springer
- Leakey, M.D. (1981). Discoveries at Laetoli in Northern Tanzania. Proceedings of the Geologists' Association. 92 (2), pp. 81–86.
- Tuttle, R.H., Webb, D.M., & Baksh, M. (1991). Laetoli Toes and Australopithecus afarensis. Human Evolution. 6 (3) pp. 193–200.
- Tuttle, R.H. (2008). Footprint Clues in Hominid Evolution and Forensics: Lessons and Limitations. Ichnos. 15 (3-4), pp. 158–165.
- White, T.D. & Suwa, G. (1987). Hominid footprints at Laetoli: Facts and Interpretations. American Journal of Physical Anthropology. 72 (4). pp. 485–514.
- Zaitsev, AN, Wenzel, T, Spratt, J, Williams, TC, Strekopytov, S, Sharygin, VV, Petrov, SV, Golovina, TA, Zaitseva, EO & Markl, G. (2011). Was Sadiman volcano a source for the Laetoli Footprint Tuff? Journal of Human Evolution 61(1) pp. 121–124.
- Sáez, R. (2019). Evolución humana: prehistoria y origen de la compasión (in Spanish). Spain: Almuzara. p. 30.
