= Olmoti Crater =

Volcanic crater in Arusha Region of Tanzania

- Kasoko la Olmoti (Swahili)
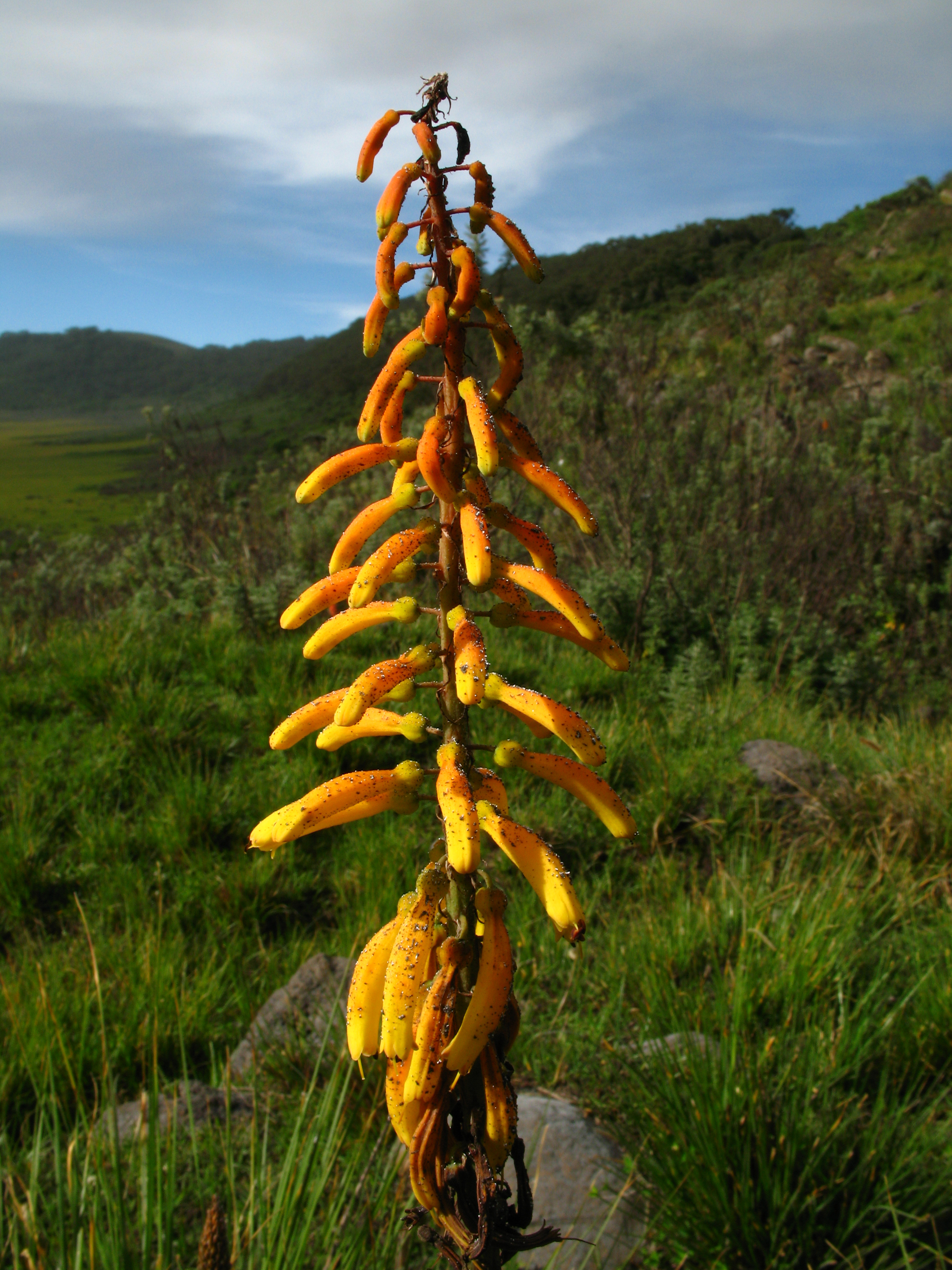
- flora on Olmoti Crater rim

Highest point
- Elevation: 3,080 m (10,100 ft)
- Coordinates: 2°54′45.36″S 35°47′13.56″E

Dimensions
- Length: 6.5 km (4.0 mi) north-south

Geography
- Country: Tanzania
- Region: Arusha Region
- District: Ngorongoro District

Geology
- Formed by: Volcanism along the Gregory Rift
- Volcanic zone: Crater Highlands
- Last eruption: Pleistocene

Climbing
- Access: Ngorongoro Conservation Area

The Olmoti Crater (Swahili: Kasoko la Olmoti) is located at an elevation of 3,088 meters. Olmoti, which means "Cooking Pot" in Maasai, is an extinct volcano. The crater is located in Nainokanoka ward of Ngorongoro District in Arusha Region of Tanzania. Olmoti's highest peak is 3,080m, and the crater is approximately 6.5 km in diameter.

The crater is a caldera and is within UNESCO Biosphere Reserve protection program and the Ngorongoro Conservation Area. The Munge Waterfall is located on the western crater rim. The Munge River provides fresh water for wildlife and also feeds wetlands and Lake Magadi on the floor of the Ngorongoro Crater. The crater is part of the Crater Highlands geographic zone. The crater is known for its unique flora.
