= Mount Loolmalasin =

Mountain in Arusha Region, Tanzania

Loolmalasin
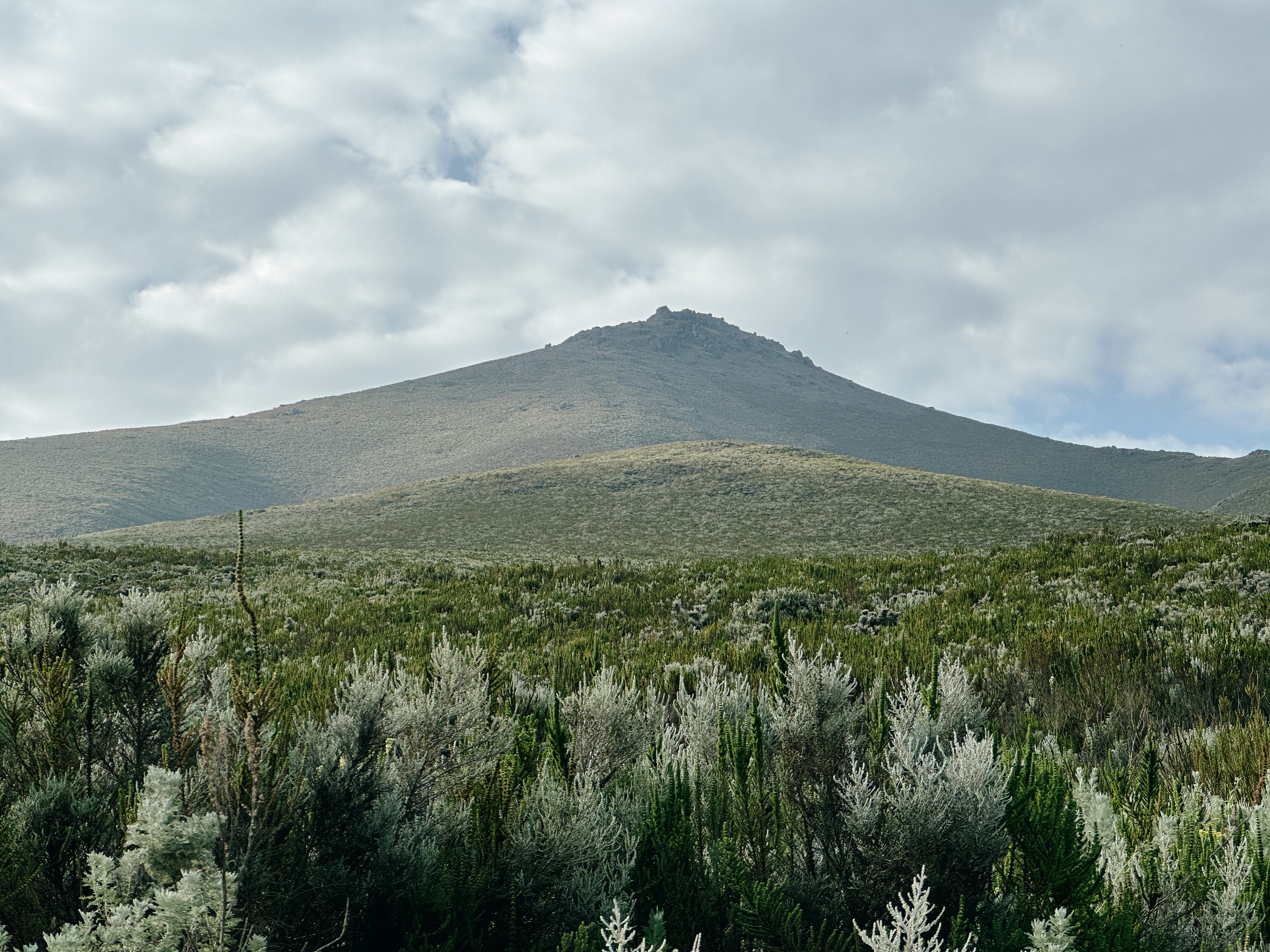
- View of Loolmalasin from the north

Highest point
- Elevation: 3,682 m (12,080 ft)
- Prominence: 2,040 m (6,690 ft)
- Listing: Ultra
- Coordinates: 3°03′06″S 35°49′00″E

Geography
- Location within Tanzania
- Location: Arusha Region, Tanzania

Geology
- Formed by: Volcanism along the Gregory Rift

Mount Loolmalasin or Loolmalassin (Swahili: Mlima Lolmalasin) is a mountain located in the Ngorongoro District of the Arusha Region, Tanzania. It has a peak elevation of 3,682 metres (12,080 ft) above sea level. It is, after Mount Kilimanjaro and Mount Meru, the third-highest mountain in Tanzania if Kilimanjaro's three peaks are considered to be one mountain. The Mountain is located entirely within Nainokanoka ward. The volcano is located in the geographic area of the Crater Highlands and is an extinct volcano that last erupted in the Pleistocene. Mount Loolmalasin is the second tallest mountain in Arusha Region and the highest point in Ngorongoro District. The mountain also is the source of Simiyu River, which flows west to Lake Victoria in Simiyu Region.

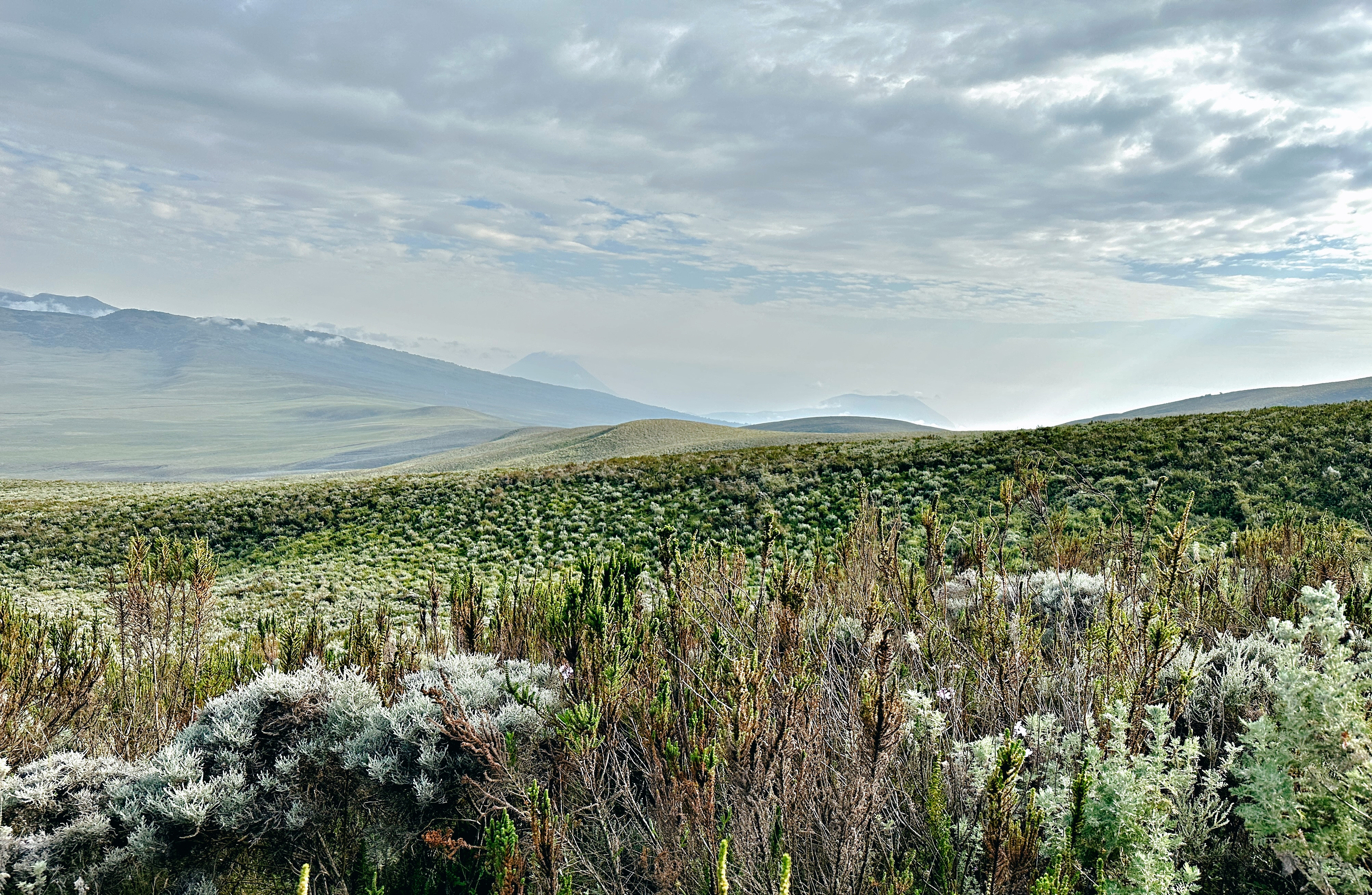

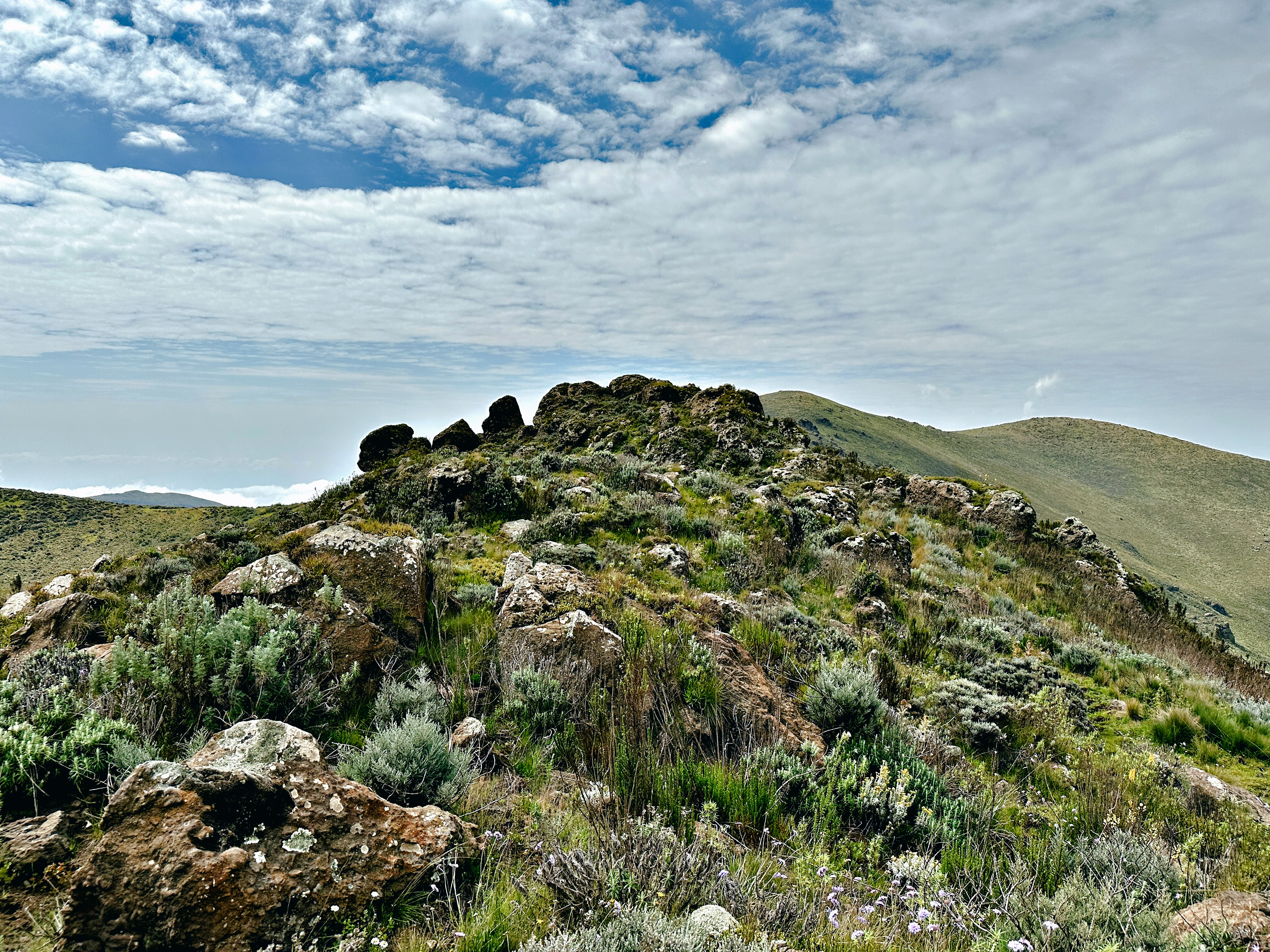

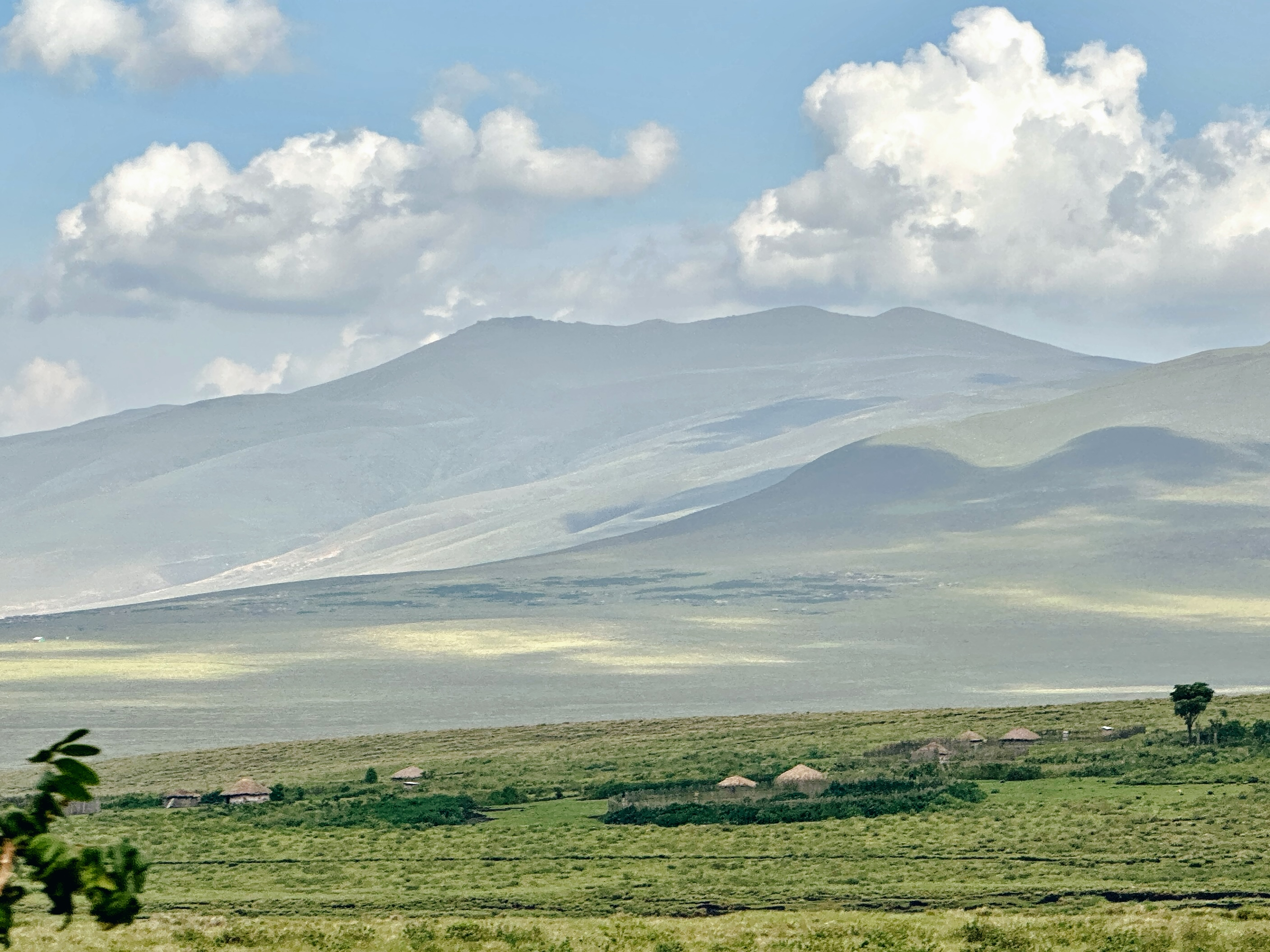

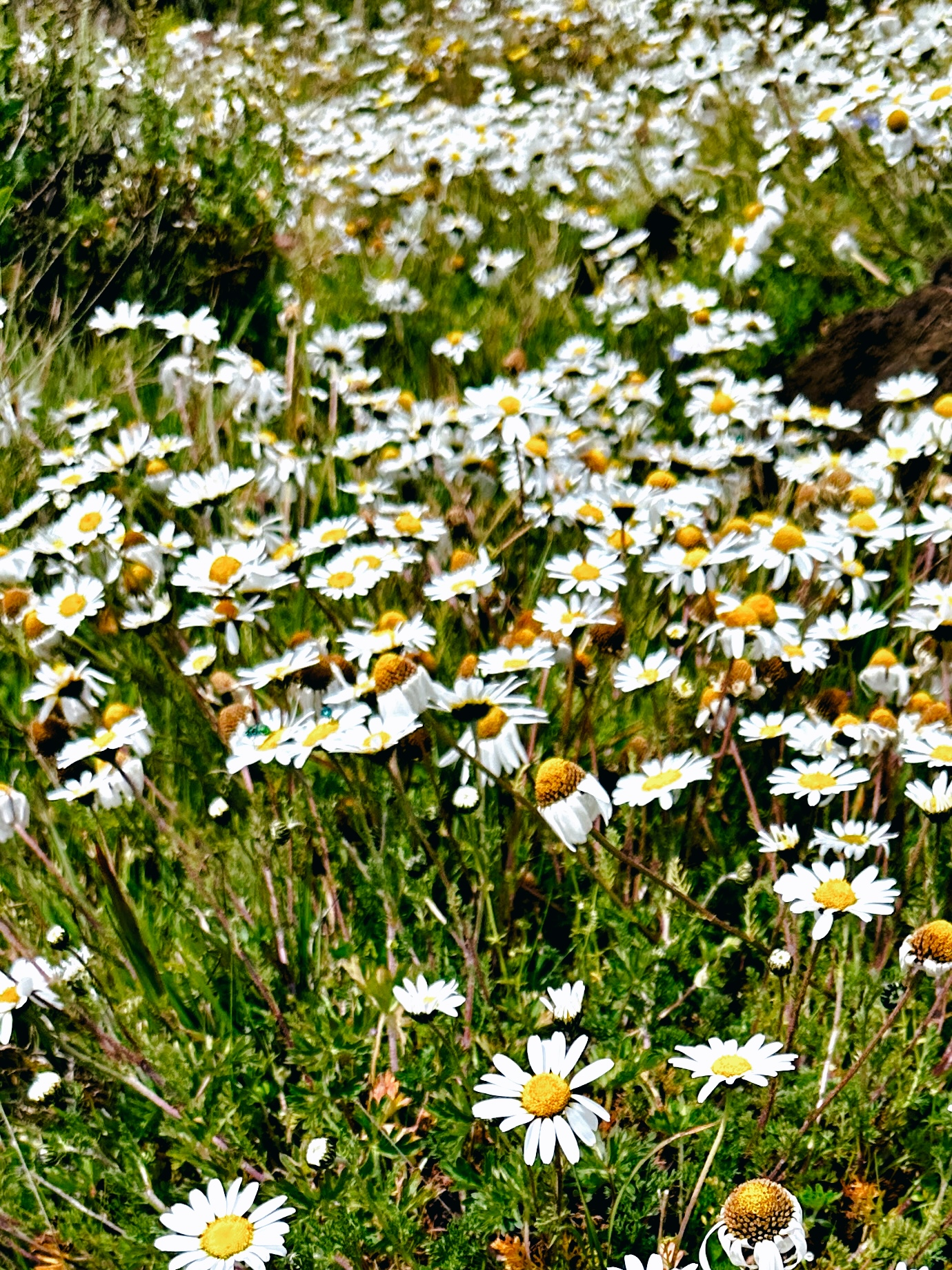

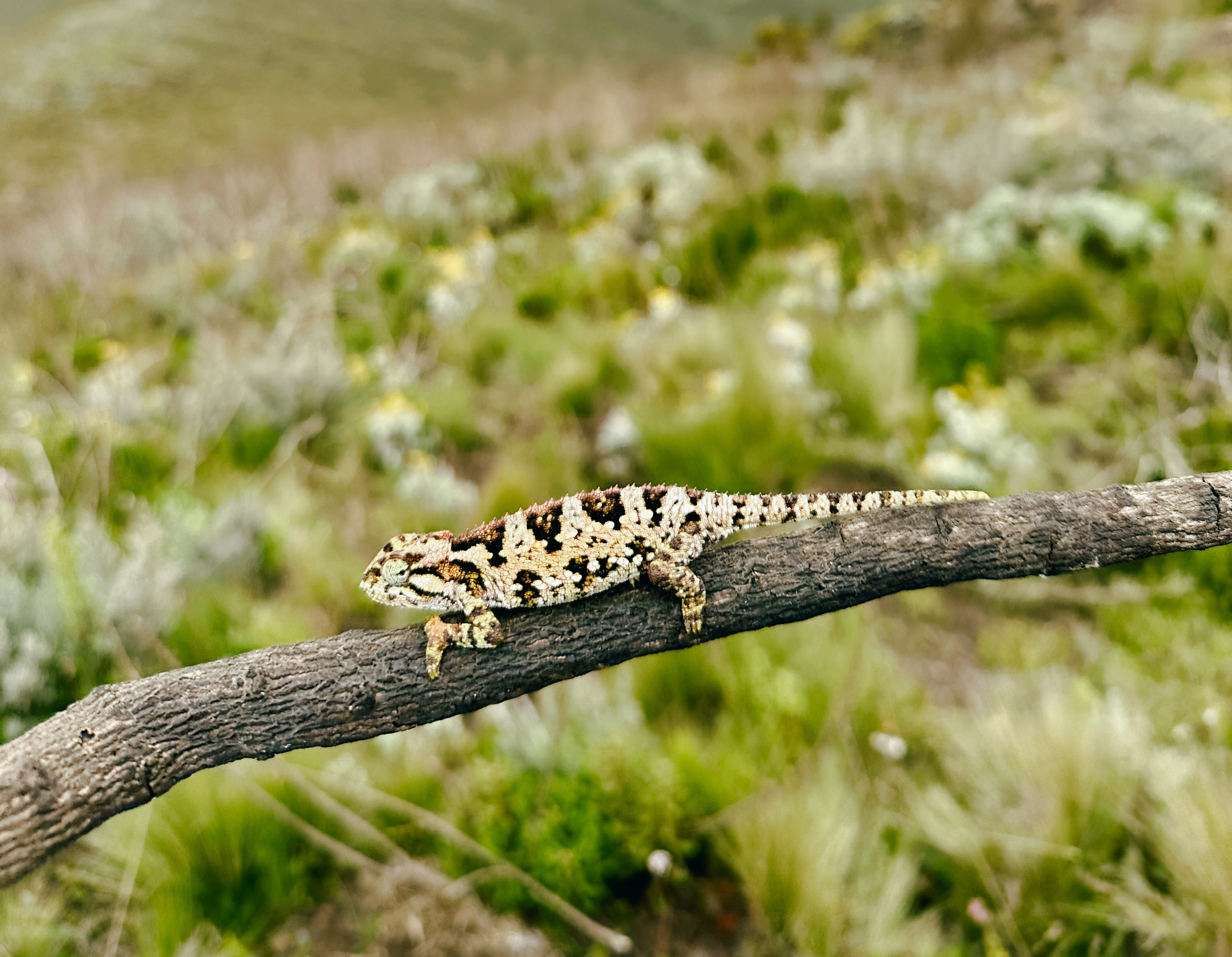

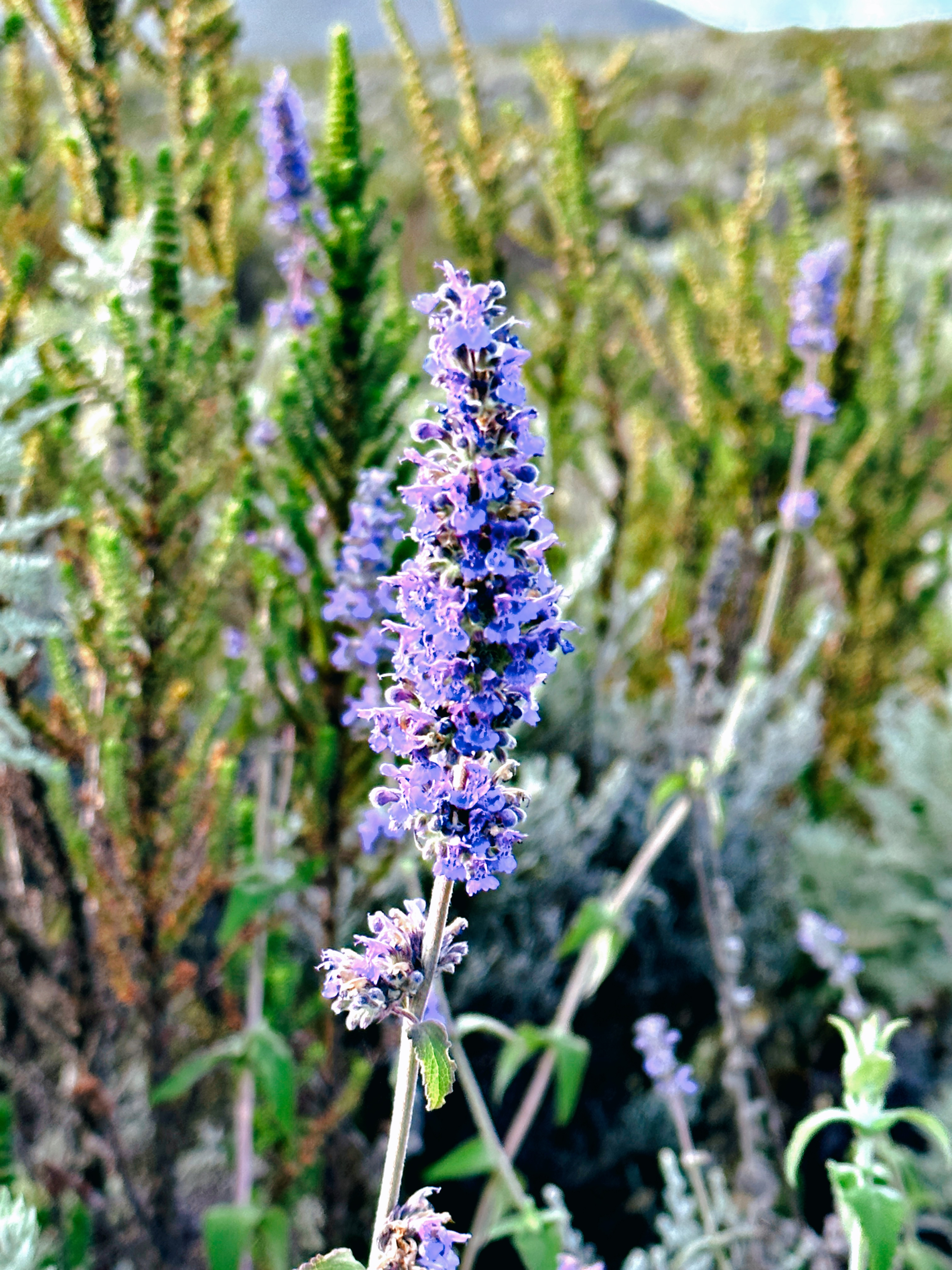

== See also ==
- List of Ultras of Africa
