= Empakaai Crater =

Volcanic crater in Arusha Region of Tanzania

Empakaai Crater, Ela Nairobi
- Kasoko la Empakai (Swahili)
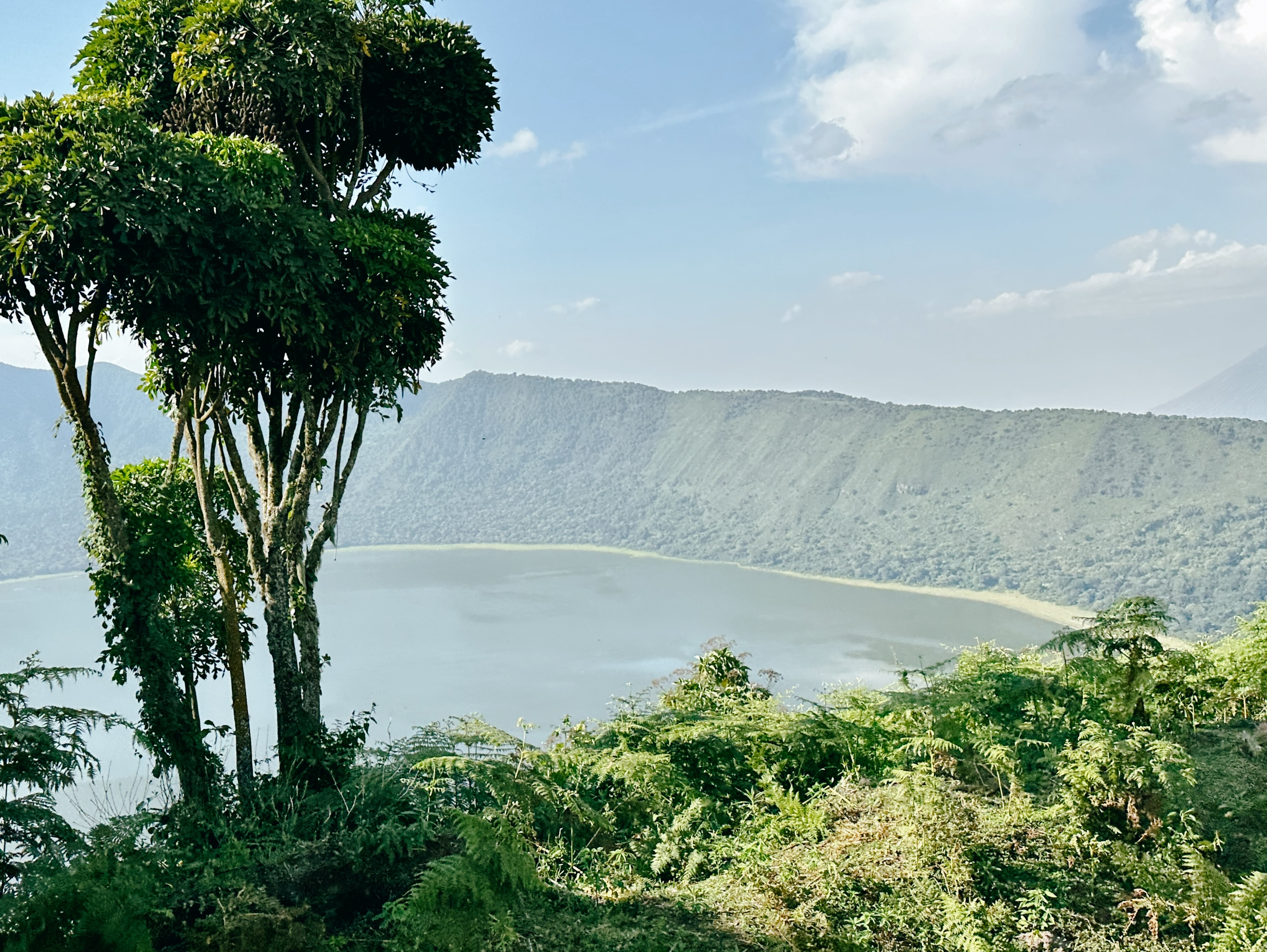
- Empakaai crater from the eastern rim

Highest point
- Elevation: 3,250 m (10,660 ft)
- Coordinates: 2°54′45.36″S 35°47′13.56″E

Dimensions
- Length: 6 km (3.7 mi) north-south

Geography
- Country: Tanzania
- Region: Arusha Region
- District: Ngorongoro District

Geology
- Formed by: Volcanism along the Gregory Rift
- Volcanic zone: Crater Highlands
- Last eruption: Pleistocene

Climbing
- Access: Ngorongoro Conservation Area

The Empakaai Crater or Embagai (Kasoko la Empakai in Swahili, also Ela Nairobi) is a collapsed volcanic caldera located in the Naiyobi ward of the Ngorongoro District in the Arusha Region of Tanzania. It is 300 meters high and 6 kilometers wide. The crater is filled by a deep alkaline lake (a soda lake) that occupies around 75% of the crater's bottom and is approximately 85 meters deep. The crater is a caldera and is within UNESCO Biosphere Reserve protection program. Empakaai's elevation on the outside is 3,200 m above sea level on the western side and 2,590 m above sea level on the eastern side. Empakaai is nearly always blanketed in mist due to its high altitude, and the lake appears emerald or deep blue in color. The crater is part of the Crater Highlands geographic zone.

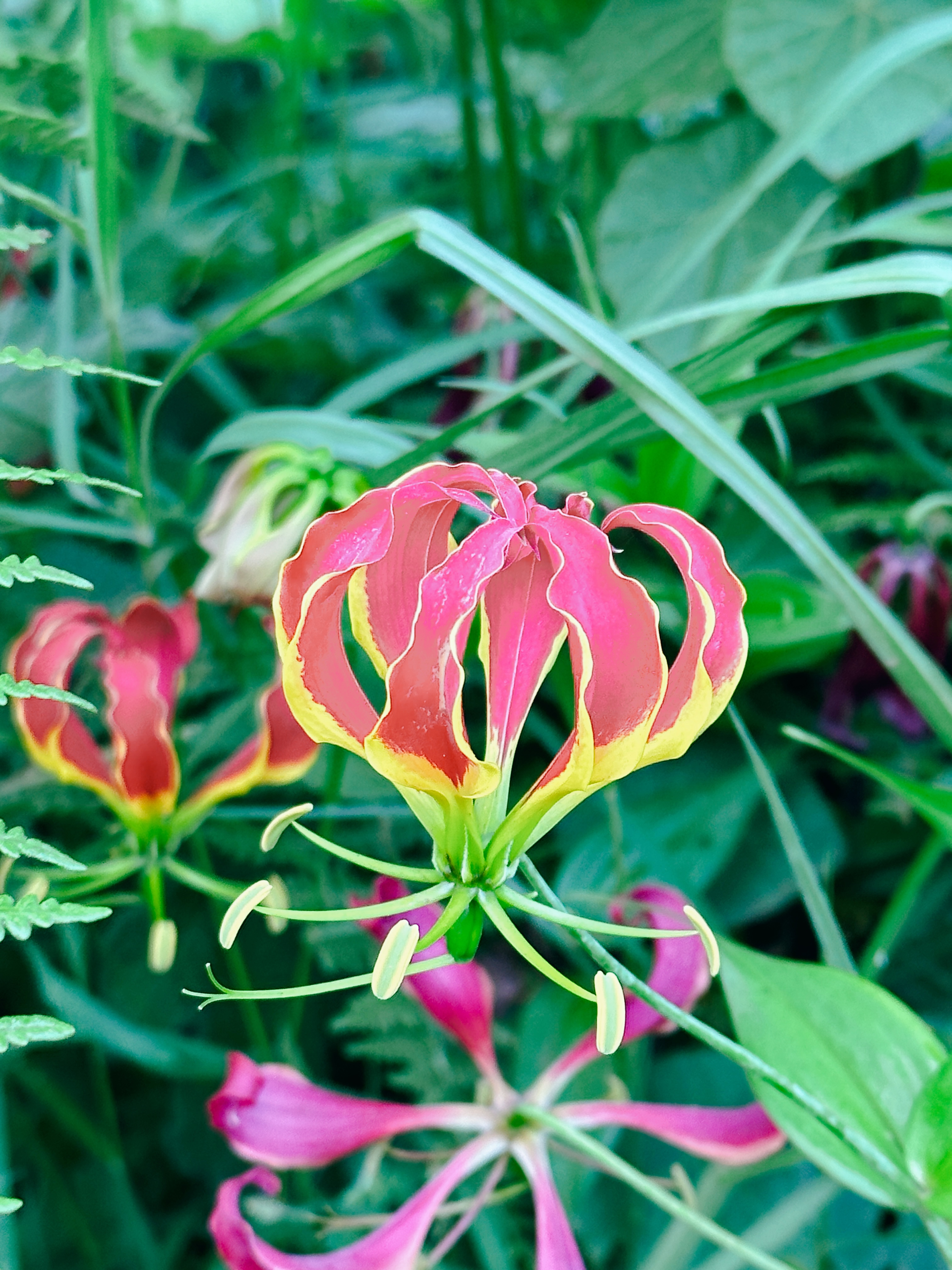
Flower on Empakaai, Ngorongoro District

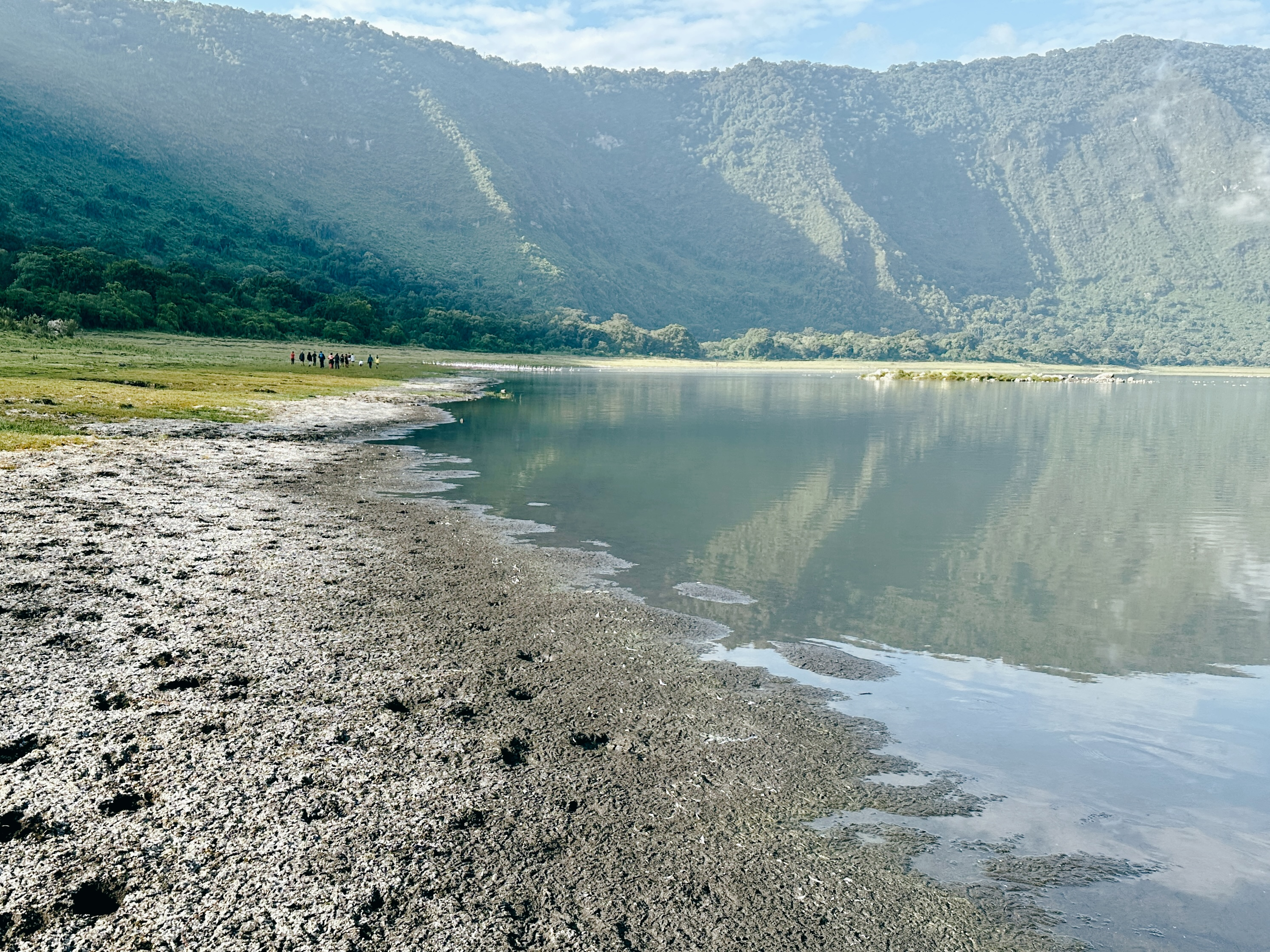
Empakaai beach, Ngorongoro District

The rim of the crater offers views of Oldoinyo Lengai, Mount Kilimanjaro, and the Great Rift Valley. Hiking tourism is allowed down the crater. The rim of the crater has two campsites. The foliage and birdlife in the Empakaai crater and the Olmoti crater are comparable, although the Empakaai crater is better for biodiversity. This area is home to the bearded vulture, the augur buzzard, blue monkeys, bushbuck, water bucks, and buffaloes. The crater is governed by the Ngorongoro Conservation Area Authority.
