= Sadiman volcano =

Volcano in Arusha Region of Tanzania

Sadiman
- Mlima Sadiman (Swahili)
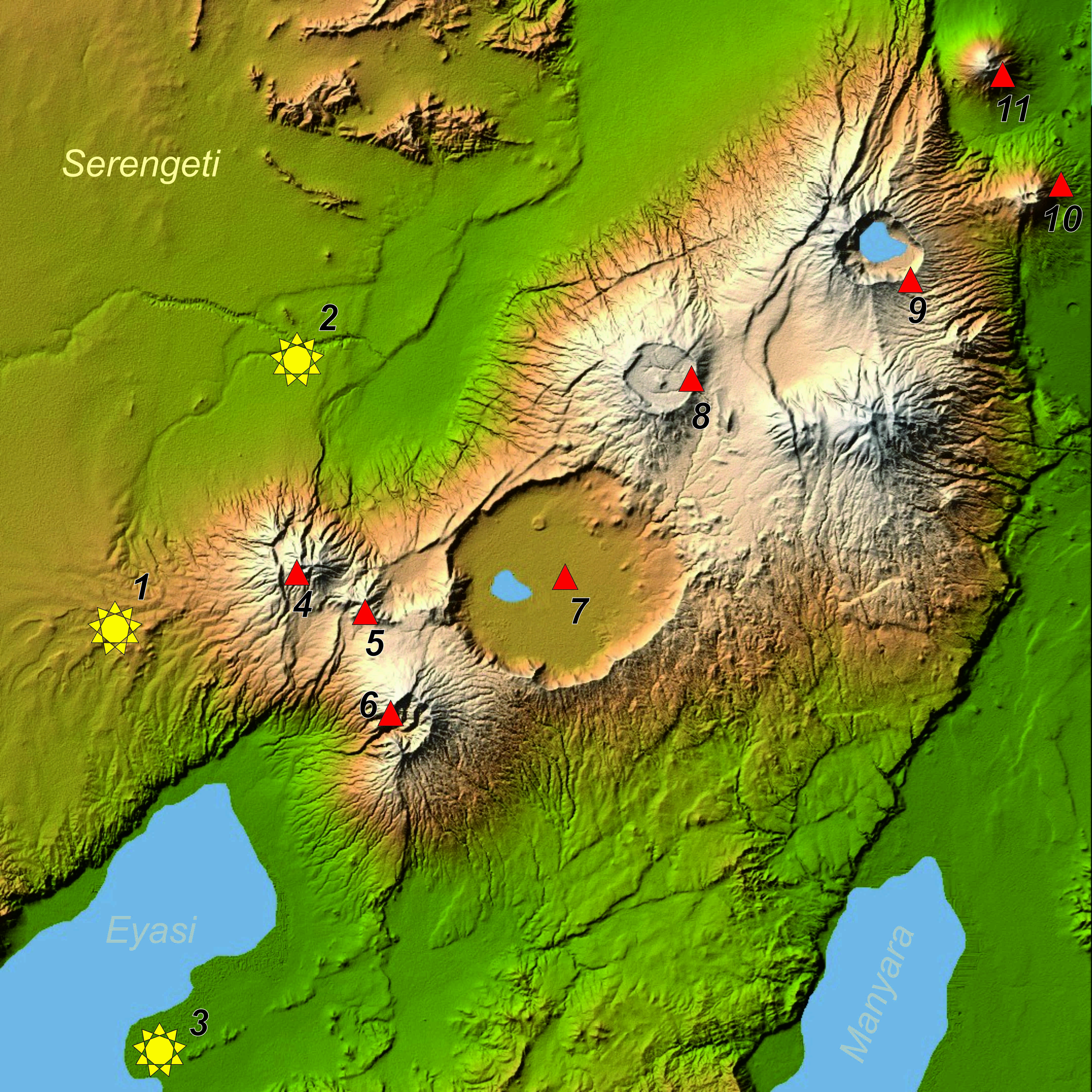
- 4 is Sadiman

Highest point
- Elevation: 2,879 m (9,446 ft)
- Coordinates: 3°11′37.68″S 35°24′46.8″E

Geography
- Country: Tanzania
- Region: Arusha Region
- District: Ngorongoro District

Geology
- Formed by: Volcanism along the Gregory Rift
- Mountain type: Stratovolcano
- Volcanic zone: Crater Highlands
- Last eruption: Pleistocene

Climbing
- Access: Ngorongoro Conservation Area

Saidman volcano, also known as Sadiman or Satiman (Swahili: Mlima Sadiman), is 2,879-meter-high stratovolcano located in Ngorongoro District of Arusha Region in Tanzania. The volcano is located in the geographic area known as the Crater Highlands and is a volcano that last erupted in the Pleistocene. The age of Sadiman volcano is unknown, with one source claiming a Pleistocene age and another claiming a K-Ar age of 4.5 million. Sadiman lava clasts have been discovered in layers dating back 1.7 to 2.0 million years. This volcano is part of the Serengeti-Ngorongoro UNESCO Biosphere Reserve in partnership with the Ngorongoro Conservation Area.

== Overview ==
Sadiman is a densely forested, poorly exposed volcano with only a few known outcrops. Satiman is part of Neogene-Quaternary volcanic complex in northern Tanzania that is part of the Crater Highlands area. Sadiman is a heavily eroded high stratovolcano with a peak elevation of 2870 meters above sea level and a rise of 400–500 meters over the Malanja depression. It is situated between the towns of Lemagarut, Oldeani, and Ngorongoro. The volcano is well known for producing the Laetoli Footprint Tuff, whose 3.66 Ma Australopithecus afarensis footprints were found in 1976. However, it has recently been suggested that the Sadiman volcano's known geological, mineralogical, and geochemical data do not currently support this concept. Sadiman is also thought to be a source of the Wembere-Manonga sediments (Manonga Valley), which are located around 170 kilometers southwest of Laetoli.

== Geology ==
Sadiman volcano is located in northern Tanzania's Crater Highlands, near to the western escarpment of the Gregory rift, which is part of the East African Rift system's eastern branch. It is made up of interlayered phonolitic tuffs, tuff breccias (containing nephelinite blocks), and nephelinitic lava flows. Rare xenoliths of phonolite lava and ijolite were discovered in nephelinite lavas, with ijolite blocks found in phonolitic tuffs.

The nephelinites are classified into three types based on petrography, mineralogy, and geochemistry: strongly porphyritic nephelinite, wollastonite nephelinite, and phonolitic nephelinite, the latter of which is the major variation at Sadiman.Oldoinyo Lengai and other sites have similar rock types and relatively oxidizing environments, all of which are intimately connected with carbonatites.

== See also ==
- List of Ultras of Africa
