= Loliondo, Ngorongoro =

Town in Ngorongoro District, Arusha Region

Loliondo Mji wa Loliondo (Swahili)
- Town in Ngorongoro District
- From top to bottom
- Nickname: Ngorongoro's capital
- Interactive map of Loliondo
- Coordinates: 2°3′12.6″S 35°37′5.88″E
- Country: Tanzania
- Region: Arusha Region
- District: Ngorongoro District
- Wards: Orgosorok

Ethnic groups
  - Settler: Swahili, Maasai & Arusha
  - Ancestral: Sonjo
- Tanzanian Postal Code: 23701

Loliondo (Mji wa Loliondo in Swahili) is an administrative town in Orgosorok ward of the Ngorongoro District in the Arusha Region of Tanzania. It is the seat of the Ngorongoro District. In northern Tanzania, Loliondo is situated along the ridges of the Great Rift Valley. It is surrounded by hundreds of kilometers of lush, verdant forest. With Kenya's Maasai Mara in the north, the arid Longido Hills in the east, the Serengeti in the west, Ngorongoro Crater in the south.
