= Naiyobi =

Ward in Ngorongoro, Arusha, Tanzania

Naiyobi Kata ya Naiyobi
- Ward
- Location within Tanzania
- Coordinates: 2.8595°S 35.908°E
- Country: Tanzania
- Region: Arusha Region
- District: Ngorongoro District
- Ward: Naiyobi

Population (2016)
  - Total: 10,191
- Time zone: UTC+3 (EAT)

Naiyobi is an administrative ward in the Ngorongoro District of the Arusha Region of Tanzania. The ward is home to the Empakaai Crater and Ol Doinyo Lengai, an active stratovolcano. In 2016 the Tanzania National Bureau of Statistics reported there were 10,191 people in the ward, from 9,133 in 2012.
