= Enguserosambu =

Ward in Ngorongoro District, Arusha Region

Enguserosambu Ward Kata ya Enguserosambu (Swahili)}
- Ward
- Kata ya Enguserosambu, Wilaya ya Ngorongoro
- Location within Tanzania
- Country: Tanzania
- Region: Arusha Region
- District: Ngorongoro District

Area
  - Total: 67.69 km^{2} (26.14 sq mi)
- Elevation: 2,210 m (7,250 ft)

Population (2012)
  - Total: 1,521
  - Density: 22.47/km^{2} (58.20/sq mi)

Enguserosambu is an administrative ward in the Ngorongoro District of the Arusha Region of Tanzania. The ward covers an area of 67.69 km^{2} (26.14 sq mi), and has an average elevation of 2,109 m (6,919 ft). According to the 2012 census, the ward has a total population of 1,521.
