= Sale (Tanzanian ward) =

Ward of Arusha Region, Tanzania

Sale Kata ya Sale
- Ward
- Location within Tanzania
- Coordinates: 2.2940478°S 35.708479°E
- Country: Tanzania
- Region: Arusha Region
- District: Ngorongoro District
- Ward: Sale

Population (2016)
  - Total: 4,892
- Time zone: UTC+3 (EAT)

Sale is an administrative ward in the Ngorongoro District of the Arusha Region of Tanzania. In 2016 the Tanzania National Bureau of Statistics report there were 4,892 people in the ward, from 4,384 in 2012.
