= Alailelai =

Ward in Longido District, Arusha Region

Alailelai Kata ya Alailelai (Swahili)}
- Ward
- Kata ya Alailelai, Wilaya ya Ngorongoro
- Location within Tanzania
- Country: Tanzania
- Region: Arusha Region
- District: Ngorongoro District

Area
  - Total: 366.0 km^{2} (141.3 sq mi)
- Elevation: 2,210 m (7,250 ft)

Population (2012)
  - Total: 7,351
  - Density: 20.08/km^{2} (52.02/sq mi)

Alailelai is an administrative ward in the Ngorongoro District of the Arusha Region of Tanzania. The ward covers an area of 366.0 km^{2} (141.3 sq mi), and has an average elevation of 2,210 m (7,250 ft). According to the 2012 census, the ward has a total population of 7,351.
