= Pinyinyi =

Ward in Ngorongoro, Arusha, Tanzania

Pinyinyi Kata ya Pinyinyi
- Ward
- Location within Tanzania
- Coordinates: 2.42891995°S 35.8428018°E
- Country: Tanzania
- Region: Arusha Region
- District: Ngorongoro District
- Ward: Pinyinyi

Population (2016)
  - Total: 5,230
- Time zone: UTC+3 (EAT)

Pinyinyi (Hajaro, in Sonjo) is an administrative ward in the Ngorongoro District of the Arusha Region of Tanzania. The area was historically part of Sonjo people's ancestral land. The Masai arrived in the 1950s, eventually the Sonjo abandoned Hajaro in 1987 due to Masai violence over grazing land. The Maasai renamed it Pinyinyi. In 2016 the Tanzania National Bureau of Statistics report there were 5,230 people in the ward, from 8,482 in 2012.
