= Kakesio =

Ward in Ngorongoro, Arusha, Tanzania

Kakesio Kata ya Kakesio
- Ward
- Location within Tanzania
- Coordinates: 3.37519°S 34.9888801°E
- Country: Tanzania
- Region: Arusha Region
- District: Ngorongoro District
- Ward: Kakesio

Population (2016)
  - Total: 6,179
- Time zone: UTC+3 (EAT)

Kakesio is an administrative ward in the Ngorongoro District of the Arusha Region of Tanzania. In 2016 the Tanzania National Bureau of Statistics report there were 6,179 people in the ward, from 5,537 in 2012.
