= Enduleni =

Ward in Ngorongoro District, Arusha Region, Tanzania

Enduleni Kata ya Enduleni
- Ward
- Location within Tanzania
- Coordinates: 3.219348°S 35.26849°E
- Country: Tanzania
- Region: Arusha Region
- District: Ngorongoro District
- Ward: Enduleni

Population (2016)
  - Total: 13,537
- Time zone: UTC+3 (EAT)

Enduleni is an administrative ward in the Ngorongoro District of the Arusha Region of Tanzania. The ward is home of the Laetoli prehistoric site. In 2016 the Tanzania National Bureau of Statistics report there were 13,537 people in the ward, from 13,537 in 2012.
