= Oloipiri =

Ward in Ngorongoro District, Arusha Region

Oloipiri Ward Kata ya Oloipiri (Swahili)}
- Ward
- Kata ya Oloipiri, Wilaya ya Ngorongoro
- Location within Tanzania
- Country: Tanzania
- Region: Arusha Region
- District: Ngorongoro District

Area
  - Total: 621.3 km^{2} (239.9 sq mi)
- Elevation: 1,902 m (6,240 ft)

Population (2012)
  - Total: 4,114
  - Density: 6.622/km^{2} (17.15/sq mi)

Oloipiri is an administrative ward in the Ngorongoro District of the Arusha Region of Tanzania. The ward covers an area of 621.3 km^{2} (239.9 sq mi), and has an average elevation of 1,902 m (6,240 ft). According to the 2012 census, the ward has a total population of 4,114.
