= Ololosokwan =

Ward in Ngorongoro District, Arusha Region

Ololosokwan Ward Kata ya Ololosokwan (Swahili)}
- Ward
- Kata ya Ololosokwan, Wilaya ya Ngorongoro
- Location within Tanzania
- Country: Tanzania
- Region: Arusha Region
- District: Ngorongoro District

Area
  - Total: 402.8 km^{2} (155.5 sq mi)
- Elevation: 1,907 m (6,257 ft)

Population (2012)
  - Total: 6,557
  - Density: 16.28/km^{2} (42.16/sq mi)

Ololosokwan is an administrative ward in the Ngorongoro District of the Arusha Region of Tanzania. The ward covers an area of 402.8 km^{2} (155.5 sq mi), and has an average elevation of 1,907 m (6,257 ft). According to the 2012 census, the ward has a total population of 6,557.
