= Oldonyo-Sambu =

Ward in Ngorongoro, Arusha, Tanzania

Oldonyosambu Kata ya Oldonyosambu
- Ward
- Location within Tanzania
- Coordinates: 2.13447985°S 35.9103453°E
- Country: Tanzania
- Region: Arusha Region
- District: Ngorongoro District
- Ward: Oldonyosambu

Population (2016)
  - Total: 8,657
- Time zone: UTC+3 (EAT)

Oldonyosambu is an administrative ward in the Ngorongoro District of the Arusha Region of Tanzania. In 2016 the Tanzania National Bureau of Statistics report there were 8,657 people in the ward, from 5,233 in 2012.
