= Arash (Tanzanian ward) =

Ward in Ngorongoro District, Arusha Region, Tanzania

Coordinates: 2°24′S 35°30′E

Arash is an administrative ward in the Ngorongoro District of the Arusha Region of Tanzania. According to the 2002 census, Arash has a total population of 8,503.
