= Soit Sambu =

Coordinates: 1°54′S 35°25′E

Soit Sambu is an administrative ward in the Ngorongoro District of the Arusha Region of Tanzania. According to the 2002 census, the ward has a total population of 13,147.
