= Samunge =

Ward in Ngorongoro District, Arusha Region

Samunge Ward Kata ya Samunge (Swahili)}
- Ward
- Kata ya Samunge, Wilaya ya Ngorongoro
- Location within Tanzania
- Country: Tanzania
- Region: Arusha Region
- District: Ngorongoro District

Area
  - Total: 147.1 km^{2} (56.8 sq mi)
- Elevation: 1,572 m (5,157 ft)

Population (2012)
  - Total: 6,579
  - Density: 44.72/km^{2} (115.8/sq mi)

Samunge is an administrative ward in the Ngorongoro District of the Arusha Region of Tanzania. The ward covers an area of 147.1 km^{2} (56.8 sq mi), and has an average elevation of 1,572 m (5,157 ft). According to the 2012 census, the ward has a total population of 6,579.
