= Oloirien, Ngorongoro =

Ward in Ngorongoro District, Arusha Region

Oloirien Ward Kata ya Oloirien (Swahili)}
- Ward
- Kata ya Oloirien, Wilaya ya Ngorongoro
- Location within Tanzania
- Country: Tanzania
- Region: Arusha Region
- District: Ngorongoro District

Area
  - Total: 261.9 km^{2} (101.1 sq mi)
- Elevation: 2,000 m (6,600 ft)

Population (2012)
  - Total: 9,485
  - Density: 36.22/km^{2} (93.80/sq mi)

Oloirien is an administrative ward in the Ngorongoro District of the Arusha Region of Tanzania. The ward covers an area of 261.9 km^{2} (101.1 sq mi), and has an average elevation of 2,000 m (6,600 ft). According to the 2012 census, the ward has a total population of 9,485.
