= Ngorongoro (Tanzanian ward) =

Ward in Ngorongoro District, Arusha Region

Coordinates: 3°15′S 35°31′E

Ngorongoro is an administrative ward in the Ngorongoro District of the Arusha Region of Tanzania. The ward is home to the Ngorongoro Crater. According to the 2002 census, the ward has a total population of 9,807.
