= Maalon, Ngorongoro =

Ward in Ngorongoro District, Arusha Region

Maalon Ward Kata ya Maalon (Swahili)}
- Ward
- Kata ya Maalon, Wilaya ya Ngorongoro
- Location within Tanzania
- Country: Tanzania
- Region: Arusha Region
- District: Ngorongoro District

Area
  - Total: 642.8 km^{2} (248.2 sq mi)
- Elevation: 1,978 m (6,490 ft)

Population (2012)
  - Total: 4,353
  - Density: 6.772/km^{2} (17.54/sq mi)

Maalon is an administrative ward in the Ngorongoro District of the Arusha Region of Tanzania. The ward covers an area of 642.8 km^{2} (248.2 sq mi), and has an average elevation of 1,978 m (6,490 ft). According to the 2012 census, the ward has a total population of 4.353.
