= Digodigo =

Ward in Ngorongoro District, Arusha Region, Tanzania

Coordinates: 2°08′S 35°43′E

Digodigo is an administrative ward in the Ngorongoro District of the Arusha Region of Tanzania. According to the 2002 census, the ward has a total population of 10,831. Digodigo is central part of Sale Division, it is endowed with water for irrigation system therefore able to provides all type of vegetables and fruits to the district headquarters as the other part of the district is dry. Digo digo is the second largest developed area and center of business within the districts with more than 50 retail shops,5 quest houses, and other more public services as the area is developing very fast
