= Kerimasi =

Volcano in Arusha Region of Tanzania

- Mlima Kerimasi (Swahili)
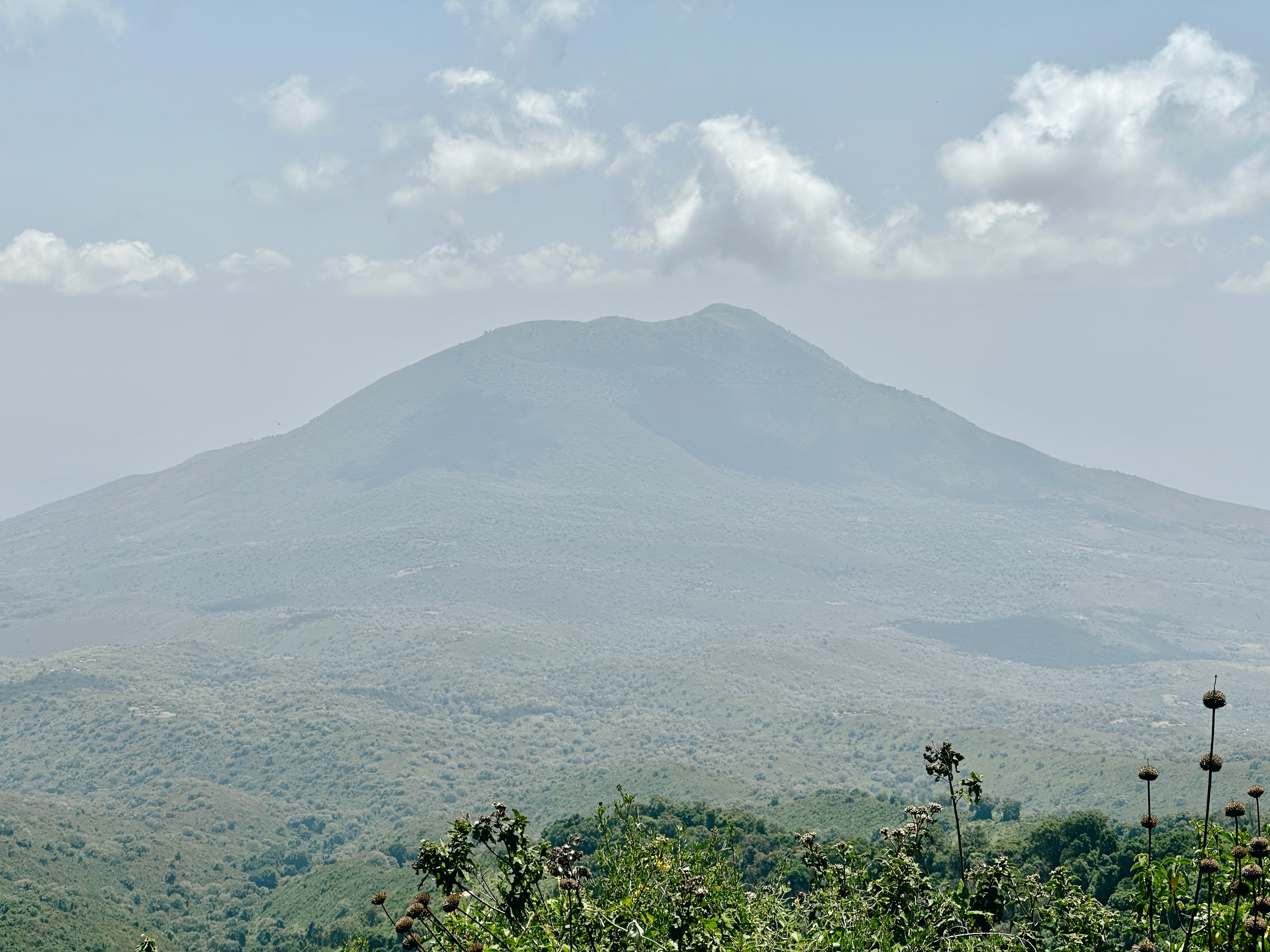
- Kerimasi from the west

Highest point
- Peak: Kerimasi Peak
- Elevation: 2,602 m (8,537 ft)
- Coordinates: 2°52′25.32″S 35°57′10.08″E

Geography
- Country: Tanzania
- Region: Arusha Region
- District: Monduli District

Geology
- Formed by: Volcanism along the Gregory Rift
- Mountain type: Shield volcano
- Volcanic zone: Crater Highlands
- Last eruption: Pleistocene

Climbing
- Access: Public

Kerimasi Volcano, also known as Kerimasi (Swahili: Mlima Kerimasi) at 2,602 metres (8,537 ft) is an extinct shield volcano located in Monduli District of Arusha Region in Tanzania. The majority of the mountain lies in Engaruka Ward, and a quarter of it is in the Ngorongoro Conservation Area. The volcano is located in the geographic area known as the Crater Highlands and is a shield volcano that last erupted in the Pleistocene.

== Geology and Mineral composition ==
Kerimasi, an extinct nephelinite volcano in northern Tanzania's eastern rift valley, emitted carbonatite tephra during its final eruptive phase. The tephra was primarily composed of alkali carbonatite, making it the earliest well-documented example of premodern natrocarbonatite volcanism. The main carbonate mineral was nyerereite, which is also the major mineral in present natrocarbonatite lava flows from the neighboring volcano Oldoinyo Lengai. Kerimasi's nyerereite was leached of its alkalis by meteoric water, and it is currently represented by calcite pseudomorphs.
