= Orgosorok =

Orgosorok Kata ya Orgosorok
- Ward
- Location within Tanzania
- Coordinates: 2.0478849°S 35.6254091°E
- Country: Tanzania
- Region: Arusha Region
- District: Ngorongoro District
- Ward: Orgosorok

Population (2016)
  - Total: 13,690
- Time zone: UTC+3 (EAT)

Orgosorok is an administrative ward in the Ngorongoro District of the Arusha Region of Tanzania. In 2016 the Tanzania National Bureau of Statistics report there were 13,690 people in the ward, from 12,268 in 2012.
