= Crater Highlands =

Geologic region along the East African Rift in Tanzania

Coordinates: 3°05′05″S 35°40′54″E

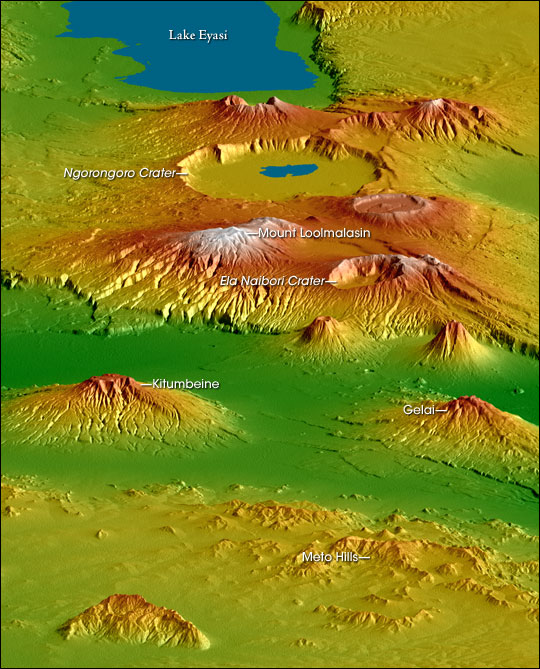
Topographical map of the Crater Highlands, looking from the north to the southwest.

The Crater Highlands or Ngorongoro Volcanic Highlands (Milima kasoko ya Ngorongoro , in Swahili) are a geological region along the East African Rift in the Arusha Region and parts of northern Manyara Region in north Tanzania. The Crater Highlands are made up of several large volcanic complexes, including the 2.4-2.2 Ma Lemagarut and 2.25-2.0 Ma Ngorongoro basalt-trachybasalt-trachyandesite volcanoes (Ngorongoro also contains trachydacite) and the 1.6-1.5 Ma Oldeani basalt-trachyandesite volcano.

== Geology ==
The highlands are located in a spreading zone at the intersection of branches of two tectonic plates, the African Plate and Somali Plate, resulting in distinctive and prominent landforms.

The highlands are named for the many craters and calderas present. As is common in spreading zones, volcanoes can be found here. Magma, rising to fill the gaps, reaches the surface and builds cones. Calderas form if a volcano explodes or collapses, following the emptying of the magma chamber below, and further spreading can fracture the volcanoes as well.

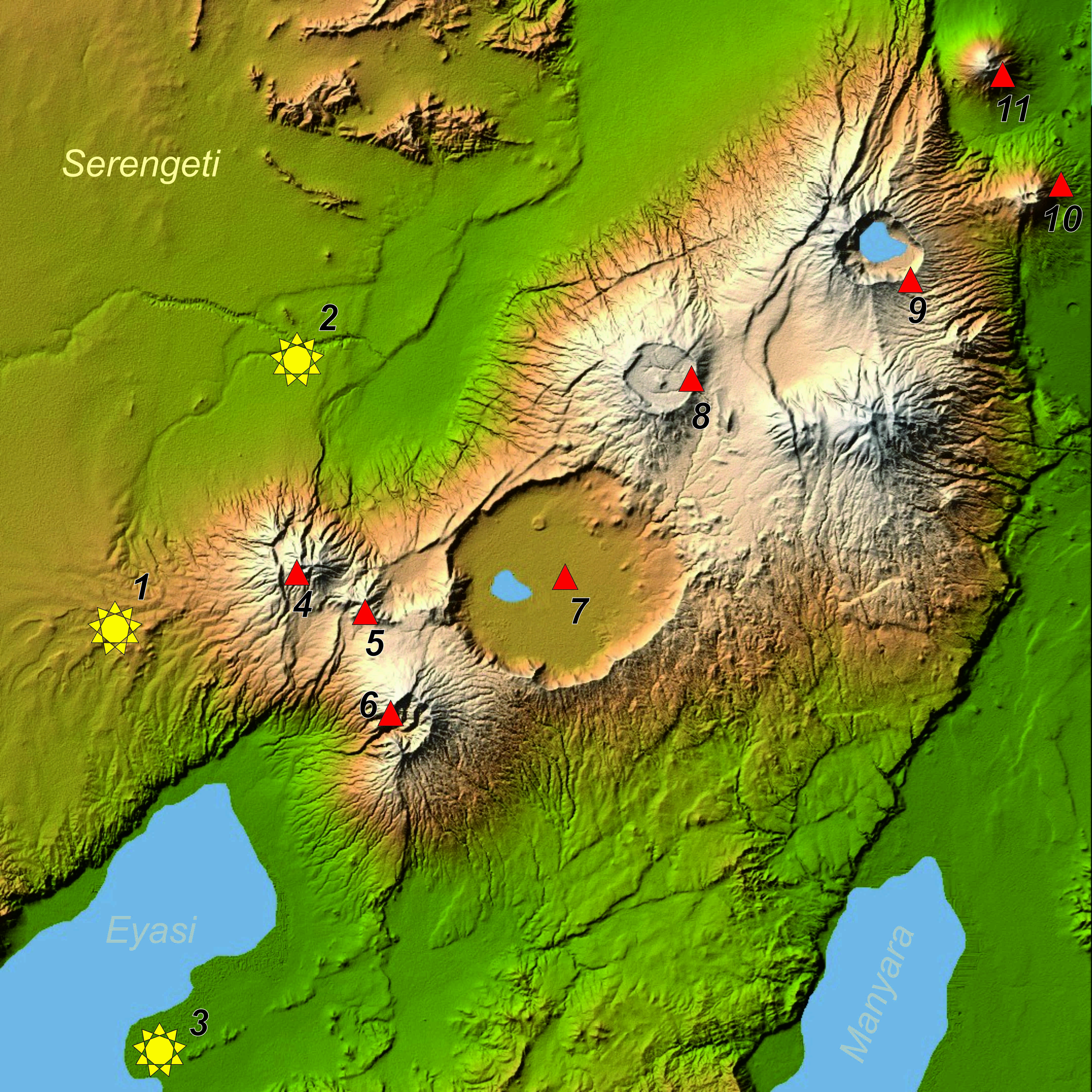
Sites: 1 - Laetoli (Australopithecus sp., Paranthropus aethiopicus) 2 - Olduvai (Paranthropus boisei, Homo habilis) 3 - Eyasi (Homo sapiens) Volcanoes: 4 - Sadiman 5 - Lemagrut 6 - Oldeani 7 - Ngorongoro 8 - Olmoti 9 - Empakaai 10 - Kerimasi 11 - Ol Doinyo Lengai

== Geography ==
The following are considered to be within the Crater Highlands:

- Empakaai Crater
- Olmoti Crater
- Gelai Mountain
- Kitumbeine Volcano
- Lake Eyasi
- Meto Hills
- Mount Loolmalasin
- Ngorongoro Crater
- Lemagrut
- Sadiman volcano
- Kerimasi
- Oldeani

== Visiting the Crater Highlands ==
There are a variety of scenic walks and hikes requiring various fitness levels, as well as trips to the famous Ngorongoro Crater and visits to local villages.

== See also ==
- Volcanoes of Tanzania
