= Ngorongoro District =

District of Arusha Region, Tanzania

Ngorongoro District Wilaya ya Ngorongoro (Swahili)
- District of Arusha
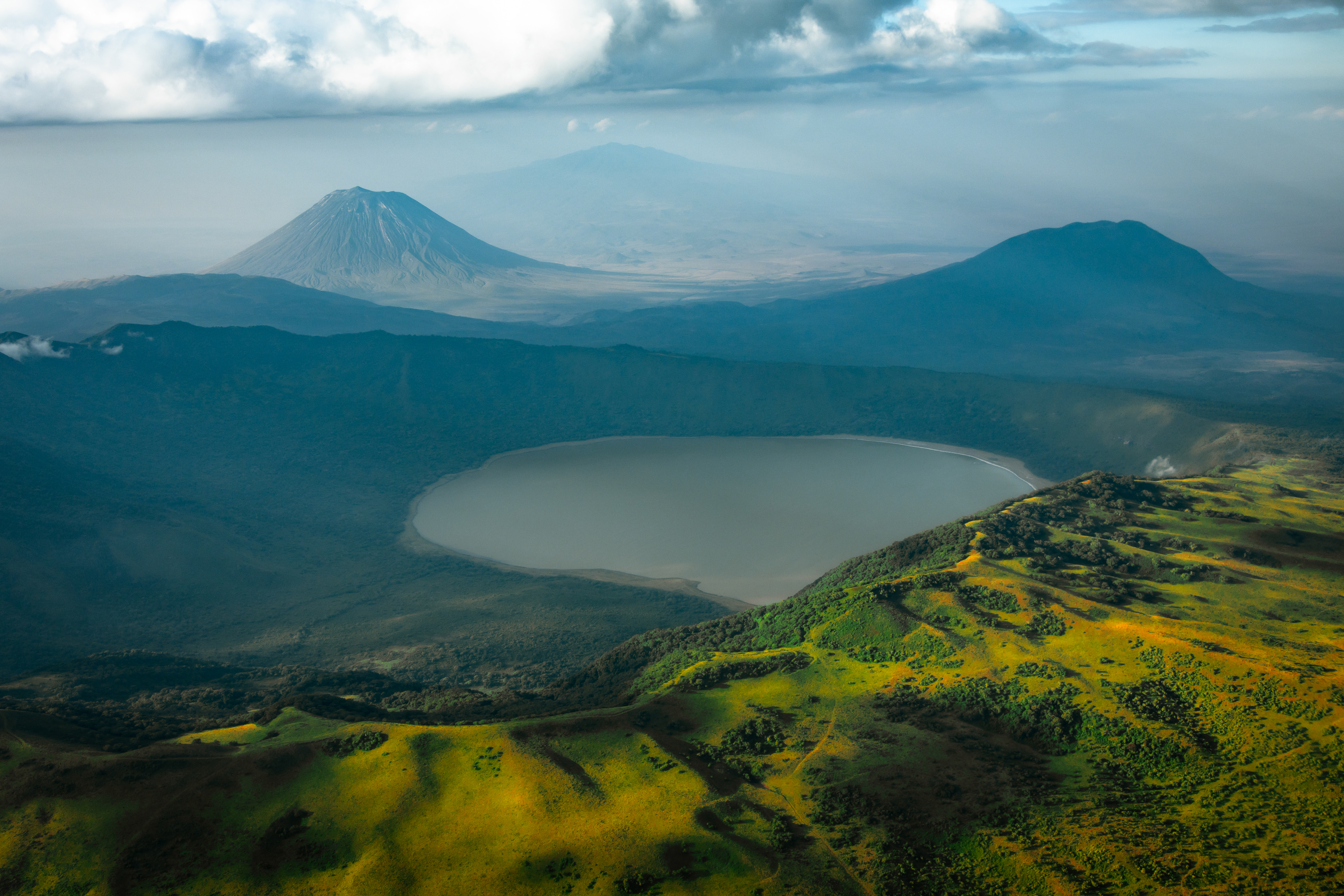
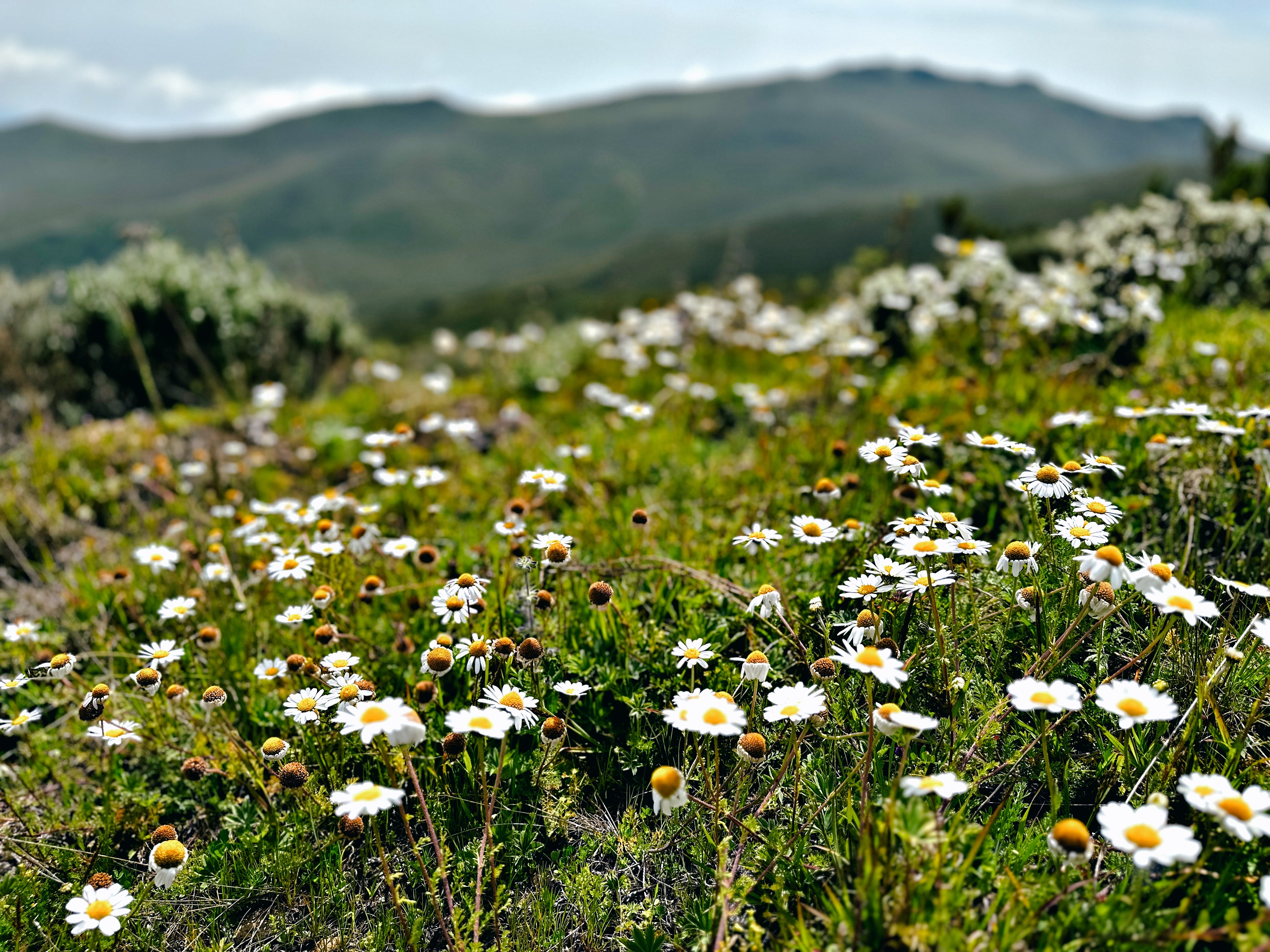
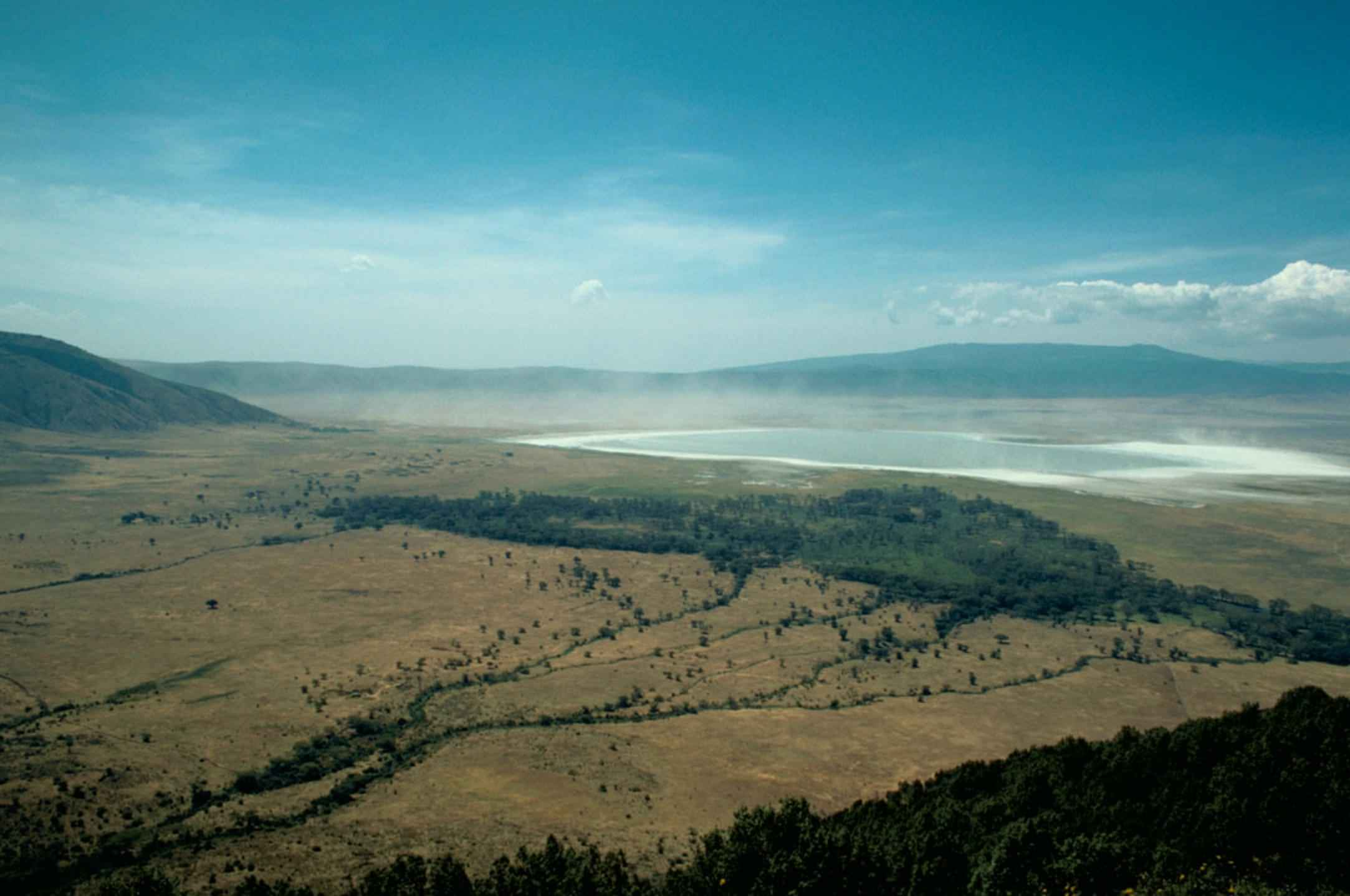
- From top to bottom: Ol Doinyo Lengai and Lake Empakaai, Daisies on Loolmalasin and the Ngorongoro Crater
- Nickname: The Crater District
- Ngorongoro District in Arusha
- Coordinates: 3°14′29.4″S 35°29′16.08″E
- Country: Tanzania
- Region: Arusha Region
- Named for: Ngorongoro Crater
- Capital: Loliondo

Area
  - Total: 14,036 km^{2} (5,419 sq mi)
  - Rank: 1st in Arusha
- Highest elevation (Loolmalasin): 3,682 m (12,080 ft)

Population (2022 census)
  - Total: 273,549
  - Rank: 5th in Arusha
  - Density: 19.489/km^{2} (50.477/sq mi)
- Demonym: Ngorongoran

Ethnic groups
  - Settler: Maasai & Swahili
  - Native: Sonjo & Iraqw
- Time zone: UTC+3 (EAT)
- Tanzanian Postcode: 237xx
- Website: ngorongorodc.go.tz
- Symbols of Tanzania
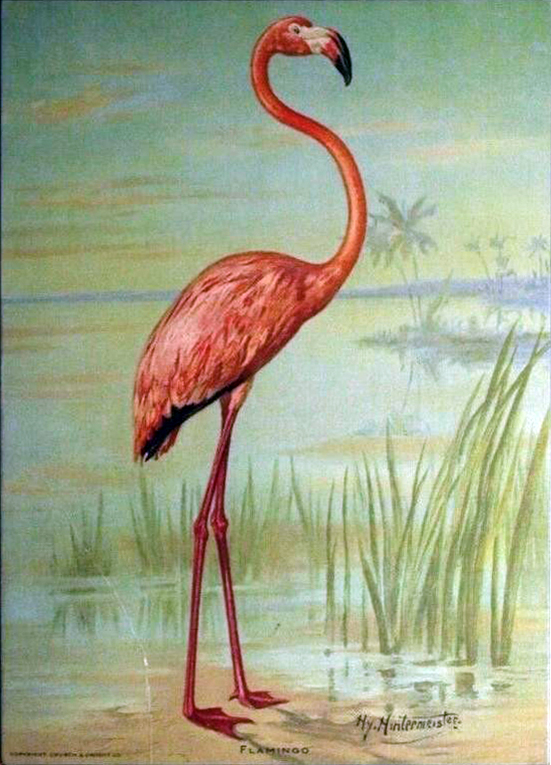
- Bird: Flamingo

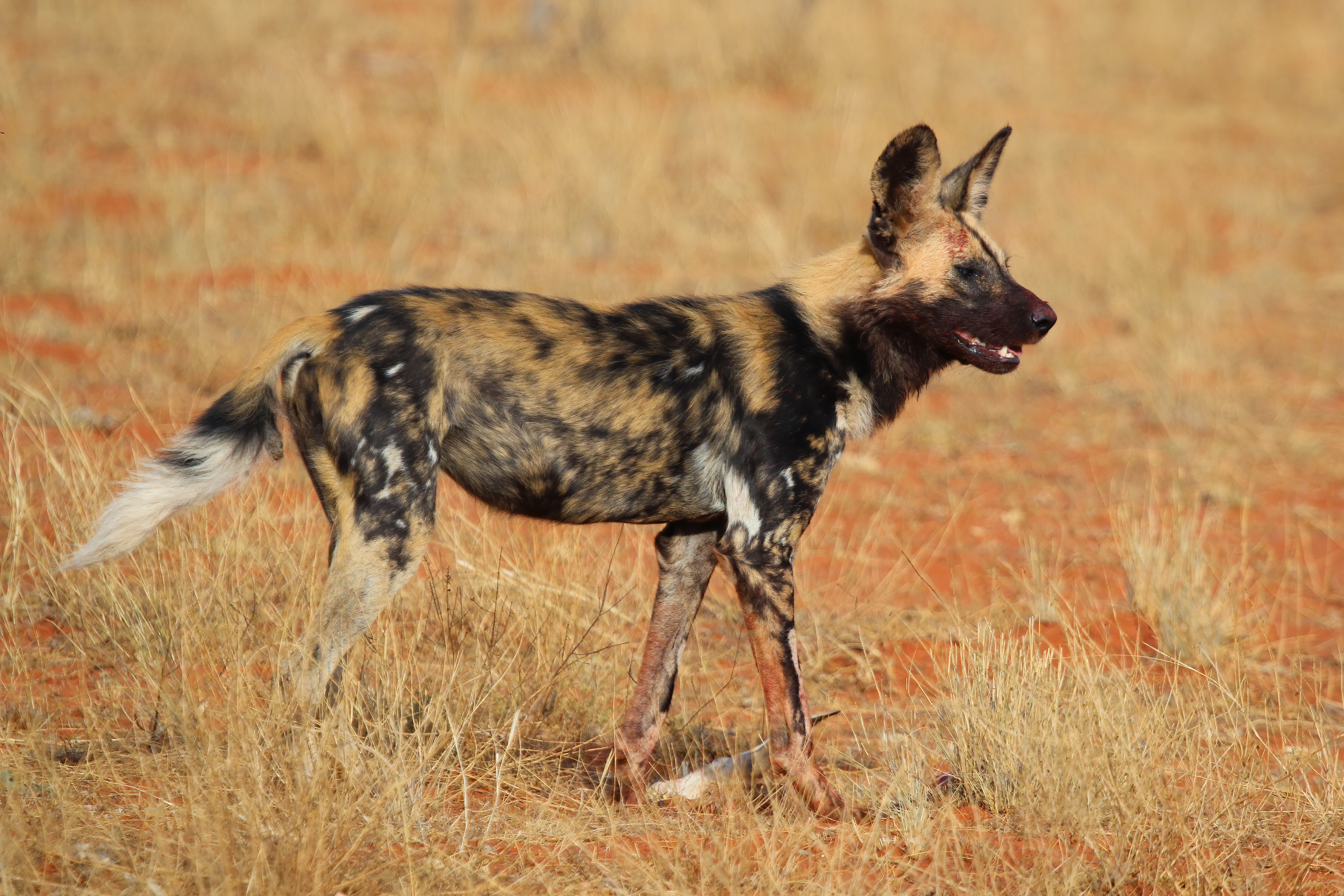
- Mammal: African wild dog

Ngorongoro District (Wilaya ya Ngorongoro, in Swahili) is one of seven districts in western Arusha Region of Tanzania. The district is bordered to the north by Kenya, to the east by Monduli District, the northeast by Longido District, and to the south by the Karatu District. The western border is the Serengeti District in Mara Region. Ngorongoro District is home to the Ngorongoro Crater and was named after it. It covers an area of 14,036 km^{2} (5,419 sq mi). The district is comparable in size to the land area of Timor Leste. The administrative seat is the town of Loliondo. The district is home to the Ngorongoro Conservation Area which is a UNESCO World Heritage Site. The district is also home to the third tallest mountain in the country, Mount Loolmalasin. According to the 2002 Tanzania National Census, the population of the Ngorongoro Region was 129,776. By 2012, the population of the district was 174,278. By 2022, the population had grown to 273,549.

== History and geography ==
The district's name has an onomatopoeic origin; it was named by Maasai pastoralists after the sound created by the cowbell ("enkorkor"). Various hominid species have occupied the area for 3 million years, according to fossil evidence discovered at the Olduvai Gorge. A few thousand years ago, early hunter-gatherers were displaced by pastoralists. The Mbulu pastoralists arrived in the area some 2,000 years ago and were joined by the Datooga in the year 1700. Both clans were forced out of the area by the Maasai in the 1800s, making the Masai the district's most recent settlers.

The NCA covers an area of 8,292 km2 in Ngorongoro District (59% of the district's total area). The NCA has 14 settlements divided into 6 wards, with a total population of around 42,000 people. On 1 July 1959, the NCA was established as a pioneering experiment in multiple land use, and the Ngorongoro Conservation Area Ordnance No. 14 of 1959 went into effect. The Maasai, who had previously lived in what is now the Serengeti National Park (SENAPA), agreed to relocate to the newly constituted NCA at this time. Several years were spent prior to the establishment of the NCA negotiating the terms and conditions for the Maasai to move out of the Serengeti and into the NCA.

According to the British colonial government, the compensation would be paid in two installments, according to agreements with the colonial authority at the time. Phase I would see the construction of water sources (by dam, bore hole, or pipeline) in agreed-upon places. Phase II would see the establishment of veterinary centers in strategically selected locations, as well as the supply of veterinary medications. This pay was deemed appropriate by the Maasai leadership at the time since it ensured the health of their cattle, their principal economic asset and a focal element of their culture. The compensation was never fully paid. Phase I saw the completion of 75% of the agreed-upon work. Phase II saw the completion of half of the agreed-upon work.

=== Climate ===
In general, the Ngorongoro District has a tropical savannah climate, especially in the Sale Division. The Ngorongoro District has an average rainfall of 800mm to 1,000mm and strong winds blowing from the East to the West. Large areas of the District of natural vegetation, the Acacia savannah, especially in the Central, Eastern and Western portions of the district. On the East and West side there is the Great Rift Valley and Mkubwa forests. The climate is more temperate and moorland in the Crater Highlands. The Southern part of the District is the Ngorongoro Conservation Area which occupies 59 percent of the district which is in one of the Ngorongoro Divisions.

== Protected area status ==
The entire southern half of the district is designated as the Ngorongoro Conservation Area (NCA) which is governed by the Ngorongoro Conservation Area Authority (NCAA). The conservation area is the only one of its kind in Tanzania with all other of the country's protected areas designated as game reserves and national parks. The NCAA uniquely allows human habitation within the protected area, but places restrictions on land-use in the NCA, including cultivation and livestock grazing. While watering of cattle is permitted, human habitation and livestock grazing are forbidden in the Ngorongoro Crater.

Within the district are the Ngorongoro Crater and active volcano Ol Doinyo Lengai. The district plays host to parts of the wildebeest migration. While not part of the park, as such, much of the district is within the same Serengeti-Mara Ecosystem, which is defined by the limits of the annual wildlife migration. The dominant ethnic group in the district are the Maasai people.

=== Threats to the conservation area ===
The most major present challenges in the NCA, which occupies 59% of the district's total land area, include high demands for natural resources and modernity from a growing resident human population, as well as the need to promote and manage tourism. The estimated 93,000 pastoralists that today reside within NCA are roughly five times the amount that existed when the land was listed (1979). Emerging houses and settlements have visible consequences. Although small-scale agriculture is currently prohibited, communities are increasingly seeking the return of subsidence crop cultivation to achieve food self-sufficiency, heightening tensions between residents and conservation organizations. In addition, around 300,000 domestic animals coexist with wildlife on NCA property.

The area's resident pastoralist population has gradually expanded from roughly 8,700 in 1966 to 20,000 at the time of World Heritage listing (1979) to 93,136 inhabitants in 2017. The population is expected to grow to 161,000 people by 2027. This population growth has a variety of consequences, including increased infrastructure, grazing grounds, human-wildlife conflicts, and land use disputes.

The site's scenic values are being preserved. However, it is evident that housing and other infrastructure linked with the rising pastoralist population may damage the values. Traditional building materials and techniques (based on locally accessible natural materials) are rapidly giving way to the use of imported materials (e.g., cement and corrugated iron) and the use of hefty poles from local forests, which is unsustainable. Although the NCAA has established a set of "building codes" to guide such advances, the results of code application are uncertain. Lodge and tented camp developments are often well-located, camouflaged, and adequately built, while pastoralist housing is uncontrolled. Moving vehicle dust plumes have a short-term impact on scenic values, although they are not serious. Uncontrolled construction of housing units on the property would jeopardize the site's integrity. Structure construction must be constantly monitored and regulated.

Human-wildlife conflict occurs when livestock is lost to wild predators and/or depredated by wildlife within or near a protected area. The Maasai people have a long history of coexisting with wildlife and have a high level of tolerance for it. However, causes such as poverty, food insecurity, expanding human population in the landscape, and diminishing resources are pushing cattle and animal interactions closer together, as well as increasing competition and conflict.

== Economy ==
Tourism provided by the NCAA is the district's main source of income. Many residents are Masai pastoralists and members of the Sonjo farming communities in the north outside the conservation area. For a long time, agricultural use of NCA property has been a source of contention. The Maasai argue that the area environment is unfavorable to livestock, resulting in lower milk output and increased illness susceptibility. Due to the scarcity of milk and cattle, they are forced to supplement their food supply through agriculture. The NCAA rightly wishes to preserve the natural environment as much as possible, particularly in places designated as wildlife corridors, and has attempted to discourage development. Cultivation is, in fact, banned under the 1975 Ordinance, but the Prime Minister has temporarily waived this in the past as an emergency measure.

Ngorongoro District Council (NDC) receives 25% of the NCAA's annual income, which is paid only when the audited accounts have been passed and only if funds are available after budgeted priorities have been met. The NDC and the NCAA have a contractual agreement in which the NDC cedes jurisdictional management of the Ngorongoro Division to the NCAA. This enables the NCAA to plan its own community development efforts in accordance with its policy statement of 'conserving natural resources while protecting indigenous people'. The NDC, for their part, retains a stake in the NCA (Ngorongoro Division) in the education, health, and veterinary sectors, where they supply teachers and nurses, pay their wages, and sell pharmaceuticals to dispensaries.

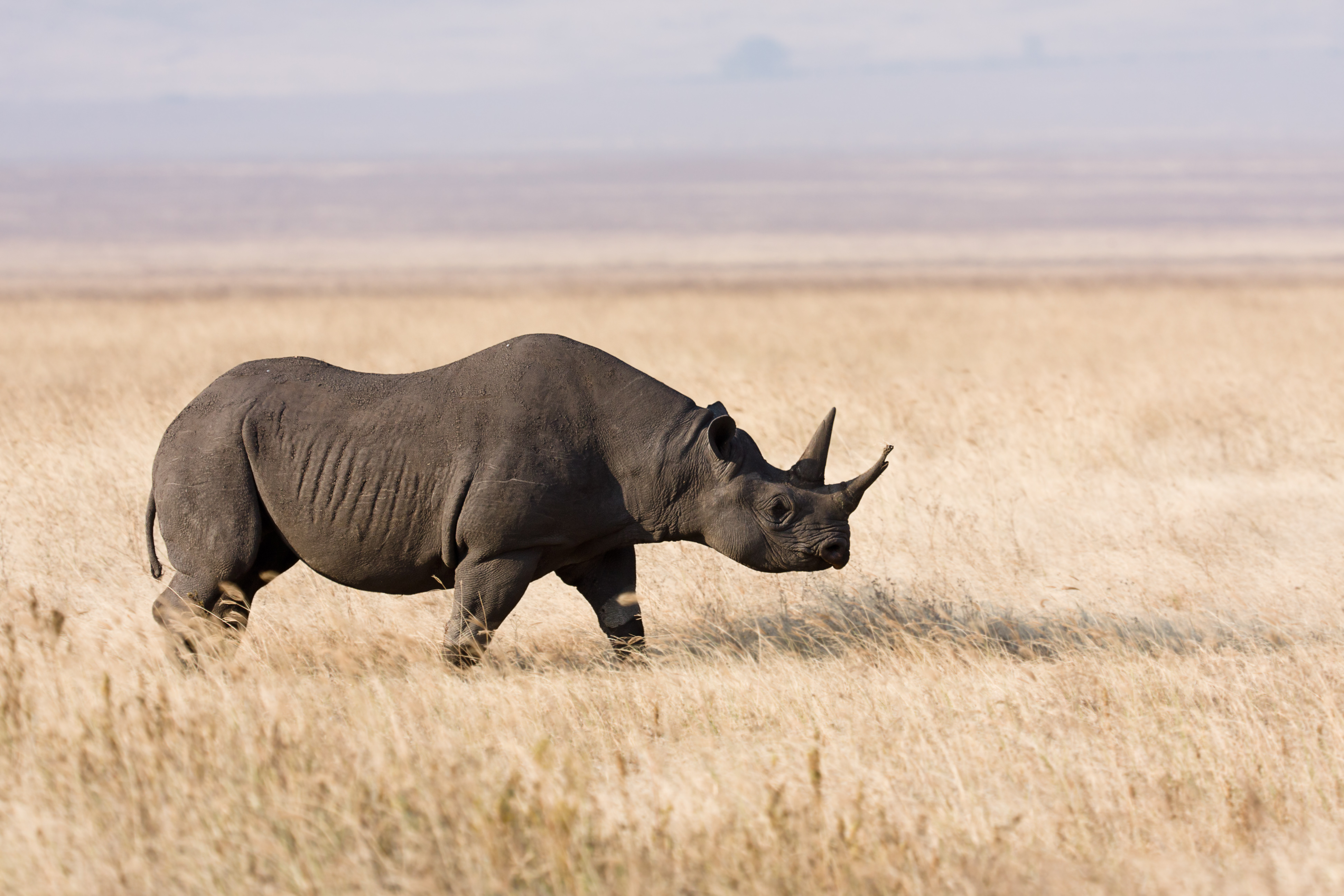
Ngorongoro Spitzmaulnashorn

The NCA Maasai villages, according to NCAA leaders, are unable to possess land. Their village limits are acknowledged at the community level, but tenure of that area is the NCAA's express domain, as defined in the NCA Ordnance. However, land can be owned outside the conservation area.

The Hotels and lodges in the area pay NCAA concession fees, which contribute to financial support directed through the Community Development Department, as well as a levee to the Ngorongor District Council. Some hotels have contracts with NCA Maasai to supply beef, hog, lamb, and goat, however it appears that the majority of this meat is acquired in Karatu and does not provide direct income to NCA communities. The hotels hire Maasai, but usually from outside the NCA settlements. They believe that their education is insufficient because they need to communicate and connect with their guests at a basic level. The district is also famous for its spessartine garnets, though they aren't mined commercially.

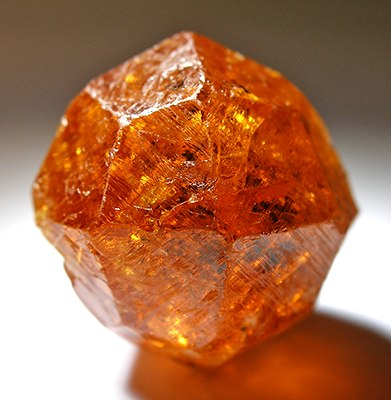
Spessartine from Loliondo, Ngorongoro District

== Demographics ==
According to the 2012 Population and Housing Census, Ngorongoro District has a population of 174,278 males, 82,610 men, and 91,668 women, with an average household size of 4.8 people and a population growth rate of 2.9 percent in Arusha Region.

== Administrative subdivisions ==
=== Constituencies ===
For parliamentary elections, Arusha Region is divided into constituencies. As of the 2010 elections Ngorongoro District had one constituency, Ngorongoro Constituency.

=== Divisions ===
The district is divided into three divisions:

1. Ngorongoro
2. Loliondo
3. Sale

=== Wards ===
As of 2012, Ngorongoro District is administratively divided into 21 wards:

1. Alailelai
2. Arash
3. Digodigo
4. Enduleni
5. Enguserosambu
6. Kakesio
7. Maalon
8. Malambo
9. Nainokanoka
10. Nayobi
11. Ngorongoro
12. Olbalbal
13. Oldonyo-Sambu
14. Oloipiri
15. Oloirien
16. Ololosokwan
17. Orgosorok
18. Pinyinyi
19. Sale
20. Samunge
21. Soit Sambu

== Education and Health ==
As of 2023, the district has 82 primary school and 13 secondary schools, 6 of the latter high schools. Most of them are located in Loliondo. The total student poplaution is 9,494. Most of the Masai community lives in the south in the NCA and traditional Maasai culture has always been an impediment to individuals gaining the capacity to fulfill complex administrative positions on behalf of their communities. For example, there has only recently been a shift in Maasai attitudes toward the importance of education. They have, rather belatedly, realized that if they are to have an impact on the tides of change that are undermining their community structures, they cannot continue to live in a vacuum. One senior traditional leader, for example, stated that he truly regretted running away from school as a child, and he has almost likely passed on this mentality to the younger members of his community. As a result, the NCAA has always had a difficult time convincing Maasai villages to use any institutions they create.

However, in recent years, the NCAA has prioritized the basic educational requirements of NCA communities. As a result, Maasai youngsters in the NCA now have better access to basic and secondary education. Endulen Ward is building the NCA's first secondary school with financial backing from the NCAA, with each ward set to pay Tsh. 2 million and additional donors providing funds.The NCAA presently sponsors three kids from each Ward to attend secondary school each year, for a total of 18 students from NCA per year who get financial assistance from the NCAA. The NCAA intends to hire NCA community school graduates of suitable caliber as employees in their ranks.

Another recent NCAA project was the training of 144 community members as militia to help with security in the NCA. This effort appears to be still extremely low-key, and these trained persons appear to work on a volunteer basis at the village level.. However, they do accompany NCAA security patrols when they visit their regions to provide comprehensive information about the area that only a homeowner can provide. The militia troops on these patrols are armed and get a small overnight pay..

The NCAA has also provided vocational training to 18 women and 12 men, for a total of 30, from chosen areas, with the goal of imparting skills such as carpentry, masonry, and tailoring. This training took place at the Hai Vocational Training Center in Kilimanjaro Region. .

== Bibliography ==
- Maasailand Ecology: Pastoralist Development and Wildlife Conservation in Ngorongoro, Tanzania – K.W. Homewood and W.A. Rodgers 24 October 1991, CUP
- Deocampo, D.M., 2004. Hydrogeochemistry in the Ngorongoro Crater, Tanzania, and implications for land use in a World Heritage Site. Applied Geochemistry, volume 19, p. 755–767
- Deocampo, D.M., 2005. Evaporative evolution of surface waters and the role of aqueous CO2 in magnesium silicate precipitation: Lake Eyasi and Ngorongoro Crater, northern Tanzania. South African Journal of Geology, volume 108, p. 493–504.
