= Nainokanoka =

Ward in Ngorongoro, Arusha, Tanzania

- Location within Tanzania
- Coordinates: 3°05′26″S 35°46′12″E
- Country: Tanzania
- Region: Arusha Region
- City: Ngorongoro
- Elevation: 2,788 m (9,147 ft)

Population (2002)
  - Total: 15,606
- Time zone: EAT (UTC+3)

Nainokanoka is an administrative ward in the Ngorongoro District of the Arusha Region of Tanzania, and approximately 300 km north of Dodoma, the capital of the country. The word Nainokanoka means place of mountains in Maasai. According to the 2002 census, the ward has a total population of 15,606.

The climate here is Subtropical Highland Climate. The average temperature is 12 °C, with the warmest at 14 °C in January, and coldest at 10 °C in April. The average rainfall is 890 mm per year. The wettest month is December with 174 mm of rain, and the driest is July with 9 mm of rainfall.
