= Sonjo =

Sonjo may refer to:

- the Sonjo people
- the Sonjo language
- Seonjo of Joseon, the 14th king of the Joseon dynasty, romanized as Sŏnjo in McCune–Reischauer
