= Monduli District =

District of Arusha Region, Tanzania

Monduli District Wilaya ya Monduli (Swahili)
- District of Arusha
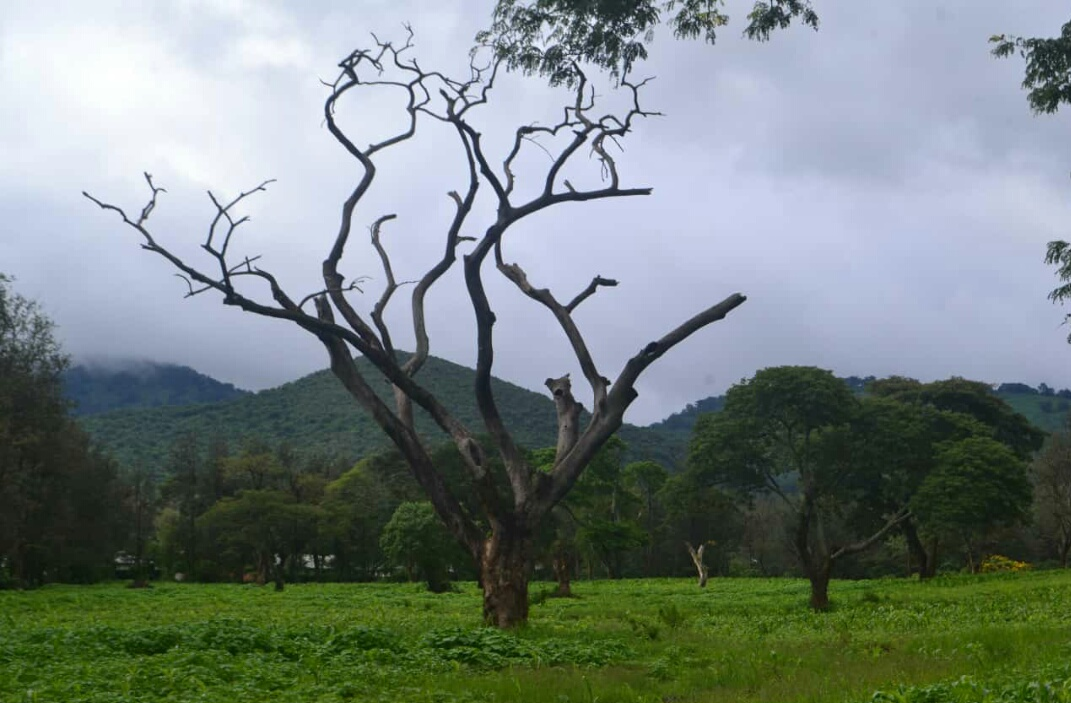
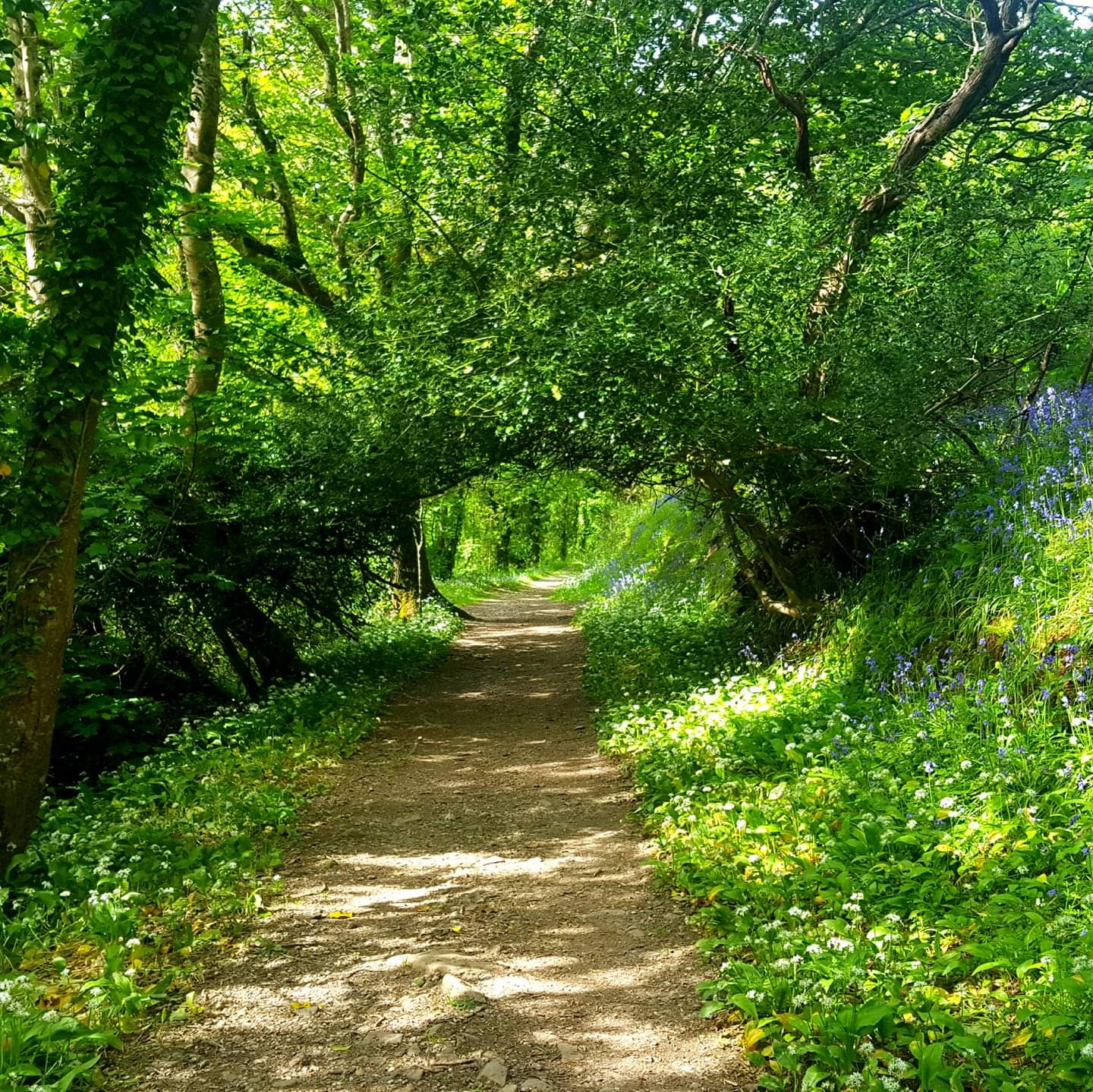
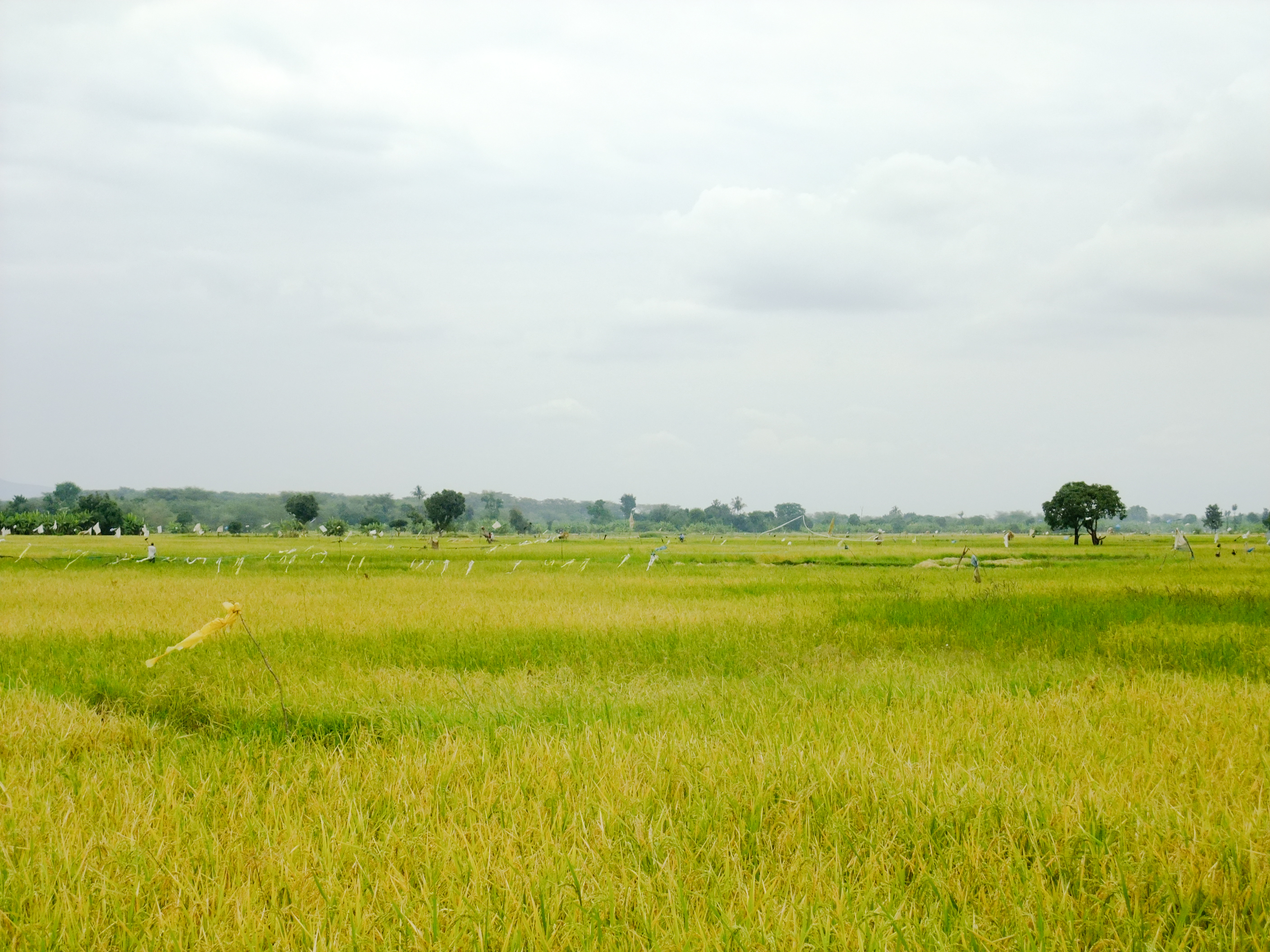
- From top to bottom: Coffee plantation in Monduli, Monduli Mountains Forest path and rice plantation in Mto wa Mbu
- Nickname: Heart of Arusha
- Monduli District in Arusha
- Coordinates: 03°18′10.44″S 36°26′43.08″E
- Country: Tanzania
- Region: Arusha Region
- Capital: Monduli Mjini

Area
  - Total: 6,993 km^{2} (2,700 sq mi)
  - Rank: 5th in Arusha
- Highest elevation (Monduli Mountains): 2,660 m (8,730 ft)

Population (2022)
  - Total: 227,585
  - Rank: 6th in Arusha
  - Density: 32.54/km^{2} (84.29/sq mi)
- Demonym: Mondulian

Ethnic groups
  - Settler: Swahili
  - Native: Maasai, Iraqw & Sonjo
- Time zone: UTC+3 (EAT)
- Tanzanian Postcode: 234xx
- Website: Official website
- Symbols of Tanzania
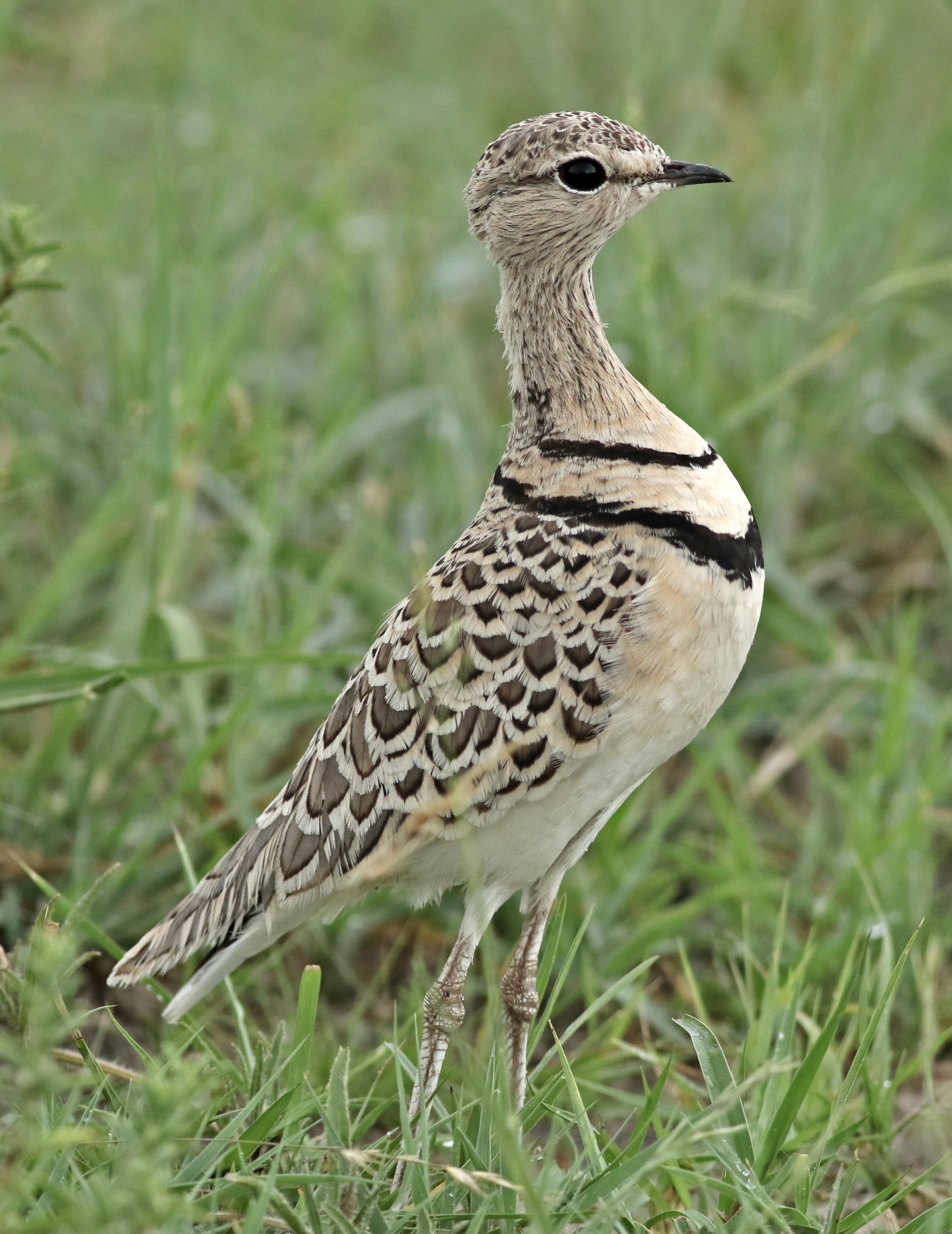
- Bird: Double-banded courser

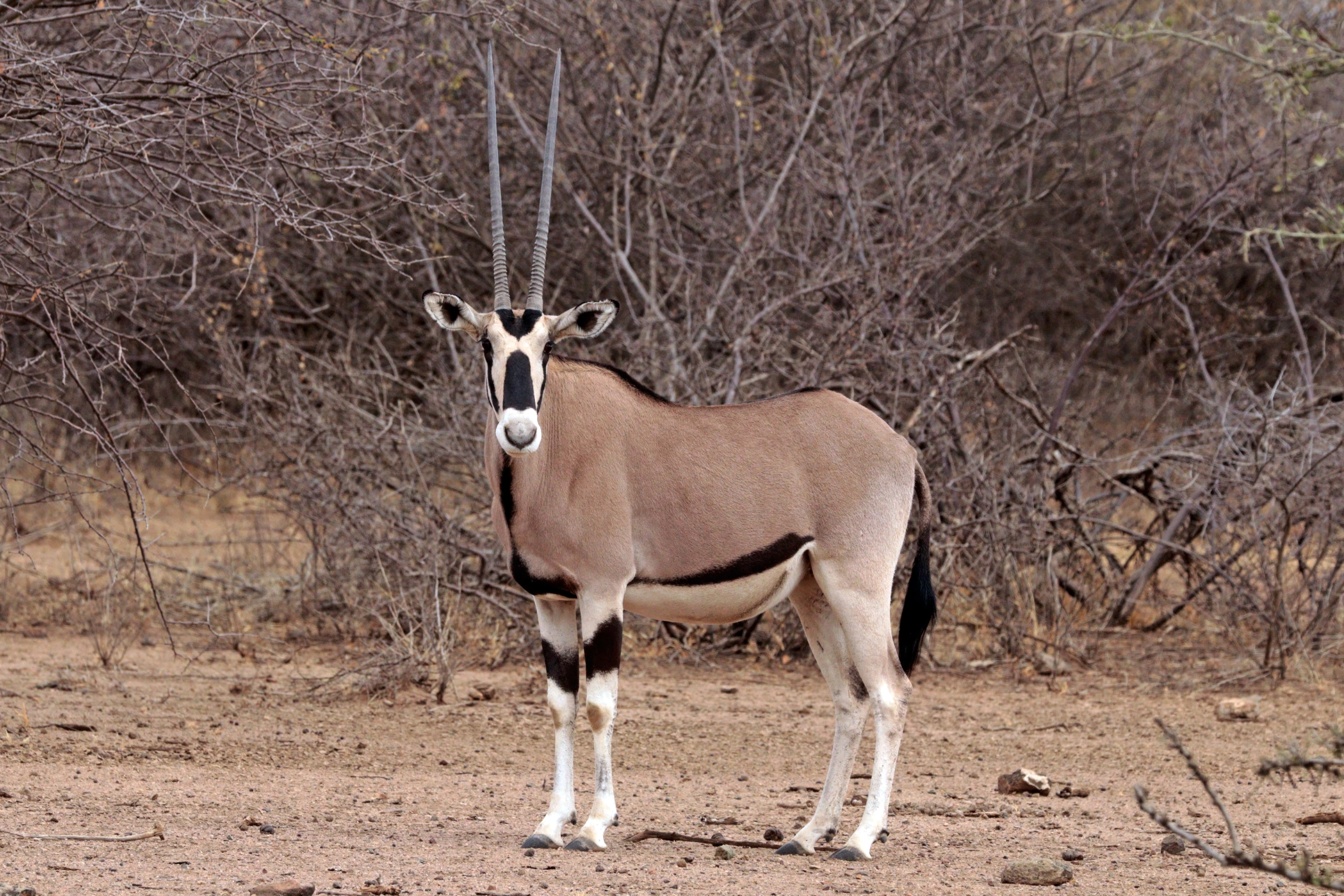
- Mammal: Beisa oryx

Monduli District (Wilaya ya Monduli, in Swahili) is one of seven districts of the Arusha Region of Tanzania. It is bordered to the north by Longido District, to the east by Arusha Rural District, to the south by the Manyara Region and to the west by Ngorongoro District and Karatu District. The District covers an area of 6,993 km^{2} (2,700 sq mi). The town of Monduli is the administrative seat of the district. According to the 2002 Tanzania National Census, the population of the Monduli District was 185,237. By 2012, the population of the district was 158,929. By 2022, the population had grown to 227,585.

== History ==
The oldest site in Monduli district is the Engaruka historical site located in northwest of the district and was originally inhabited by the Iraqw peoples before they migrated south towards Karatu. The word Monduli was originated in the ward Monduli Juu. There was a wealthy Maasai ancestor with the name of Monduli, who lived in the area during the times of German colonization. The Germans colonized the area (later Tanganyika, Rwanda and Burundi) in the 1880s. They brought forced labour and land alienation but also Christianity and European education, teaching science, math, engineering, and even German. Tanganyika gained its independence on December 9, 1961, under the leadership of Prime Minister Julius Nyerere. In April 1964 Tanganyika and Zanzibar, a former British protectorate, united to form Tanzania under President Nyerere.

== Geography ==
The District has a total area of 6,419 square kilometers, of which 6290.62 square kilometers are land and 128.38 square kilometers are water. Grazing land covers 3,983.855 square kilometers, arable land covers 1,055.475 square kilometers, and woodland covers 374.965 square kilometers.

=== Topography ===
A number of isolated mountains (Monduli, Lepurko, Loosimingori, and Lengai) and broad rolling plains characterize the land landscape. The heights range from 600m in the low elevations to 2900m in the high elevations. The District's vegetation includes a combination of forest, bushland, woodland grassland, and meadows. The District has both perennial and seasonal rivers. Simba, Kirurumo, Mto wa Mbu, Selela (Kabambe), and Engaruka are the primary perennial streams.

=== Climate ===
Monduli is one of Tanzania's driest districts. It features a warm climate at low elevations and a chilly climate at high elevations. Temperatures range from 20°C to 35°C, while rainfall ranges from less than 500mm in the lowlands to 900mm in the highlands. The district is divided into three climate zones: the Highlands, the Flat and Rolling Plains, and the Rift Valley.

Because of the mountains, which absorb more rain at higher altitudes, the Monduli highlands zone has a mild and sub-humid climate. The average temperature is 20 degrees Celsius, and the annual rainfall is 1000 millimeters. Temperatures in the semi-arid zone range from 20°C to 30°C, with annual rainfall ranging from 400mm to 600mm. The desert zone of the Monduli Rift Valley has a warm climate. Temperatures range from 23°C to 35°C, and annual rainfall is less than 500mm.

== Economy ==
Monduli District's main economic activities are livestock husbandry, agriculture production, and wildlife conservation. More than 90% of the population works in livestock and agriculture. The District is expected to contain 105,547.5 hectares of potential arable land, but only 87,632.5 hectares, or 13.65%, are under cultivation. Although large-scale farming is performed in the District's southern region (Lolkisale), subsistence farming is the predominant mode of production. Maize, beans, and rice are major food and cash crops that are staple food crops. On a small basis, coffee and sunflowers are grown.

The annual per capita income in the district was estimated to be TZS 199,630/=. (2002). The regional per capita income was predicted to be TZS. 350,952 per year (2004). The national per capita income in 2004 was predicted to be Tshs. 320,044 and TZS 399,594 in 2006. In 2008, the district per capita income was estimated to be TZS 500,010.

=== Tourism ===
Monduli is known to be home to the national historic site of Engaruka and also being the gateway to national parks like Tarangire and Serengeti.

=== Infrastructure ===
The district has a total road network of 617 km. Tarmac road been 8.1 km, 138 km gravel and 470.9 km is earth surfaced road. Trunk roads (96 km) and Regional roads (156 km). District roads, feeder roads and village access roads are mostly earth surfaced - they are passable with difficult during rainy seasons.

Arusha Airport (Kisongo) is around 35 kilometers from Monduli Town, while Kilimanjaro International Airport is about 90 kilometers away. Makuyuni Airstrip, located inside the District, permits light aircraft. The district is serviced by telephone lines and radio calls, and it has subpost offices and telephone offices at Monduli Headquarters, Mto wa Mbu, and Makuyuni. The district is also served by cellular phones that cover practically the entire area.Forest Reserves cover 23,022 of the district's 641,900 Hectares.

== Demographics ==
The Wamaasai are the most populous ethnic group, accounting for over 40% of the total population. Their main source of income is livestock raising. The Waarusha are the second largest ethnic group, accounting for around 20% of the total population. Also the first communities were the Iraqw and Sonjo people in the district.

The district's population was 158,929 in 2012 (males 75,615 and females 83,314), with an annual growth rate of 2.77. The population is predicted to be 177,346 in 2016.

== Administrative subdivisions ==
=== Constituencies ===
For parliamentary elections, Arusha Region is divided into constituencies. As of the 2010 elections Monduli District had one constituency, Monduli Constituency.

=== Wards ===
As of 2012, Monduli District is administratively divided into 15 wards:

- Engaruka
- Engutoto, Monduli
- Esilalei
- Lepurko
- Lolkisale
- Majengo, Monduli
- Makuyuni

- Meserani, Monduli
- Moita
- Monduli Juu
- Monduli Mjini
- Mswakini
- Mto wa Mbu
- Selela
- Sepeko

== Education and Health ==
=== Education ===
Monduli town, located in Monduli district, is an educational center for surrounding regions. Irkisongo, Moringe Sokoine, Engutoto and Orkeeswa. Secondary Schools are located there, as is the Monduli Teachers' College and the MaaSae Girls' Lutheran Secondary School. Land has been set aside for a proposed branch of the Lutheran founded Tumaini University at Makumira near Arusha. Also in the district is the Tanzania People's Defence Force Tanzania Military Academy.There are also primary schools in the town of Monduli such as Mazoezi, Mlimani, Sinoni and Ngarash primary schools. Nearly every village has a primary school and nearly each ward has a secondary school for ordinary level except for the newly established in 2015.

=== Healthcare ===
Disease in this area is a problem. People suffer from various diseases, such as malaria. The majority of diseases are mosquito-borne and difficult to avoid. However, due to the higher altitude of the area, mosquitoes are not as common. Monduli has one hospital, one health centre, and 22 dispensaries.

== Notable persons from Monduli District ==
- Edward Sokoine, 2nd Tanzanian Prime Minister
- Edward Lowassa, 8th Tanzanian Prime Minister
- David Eliace, a scholar and free thinker who fight war against substance abuse and prevention.
