= Majengo, Monduli =

Ward in Monduli District, Arusha Region

Majengo Ward Kata ya Majengo (Swahili)}
- Ward
- Kata ya Majengo
- Location within Tanzania
- Country: Tanzania
- Region: Arusha Region
- District: Monduli District

Area
  - Total: 26.63 km^{2} (10.28 sq mi)
- Elevation: 1,032 m (3,386 ft)

Population (2012)
  - Total: 7,853
  - Density: 294.9/km^{2} (763.8/sq mi)

Majengo is an administrative ward in the Monduli District of the Arusha Region of Tanzania. The ward covers an area of 26.63 km^{2} (10.28 sq mi), and has an average elevation of 1,032 m (3,386 ft). According to the 2012 census, the ward has a total population of 7,853.
