= Mguu wa Zuberi =

Coordinates: 3.41103005°S 36.466594°E

Mguu wa Zuberi (Swahili for 'Leg of Zuberi') is the local name for a place in the Arusha Region in the north of Tanzania.

== Description ==
It is along the main road from Arusha, Tanzania heading west towards Manyara and Dodoma. This remote place is on a long rising curve in the road just past the turn-off to Monduli.

== Local legend ==
Legend has it that a man known as Zuberi was walking from Arusha to the Town of Mto wa Mbu, near Lake Manyara, but failed to arrive at his destination. His relatives searched for him, but unfortunately some lions found him first; all that remained at this spot was his leg.

A recent article in The Arusha Times on-line edition describes a robbery that took place in 2003 at this location.
