= Monduli Mjini, Monduli District =

Ward and district capital of the Monduli District in the Arusha Region of Tanzania

Monduli Mjini Kata ya Monduli Mjini (Swahili)
- Ward of Monduli District
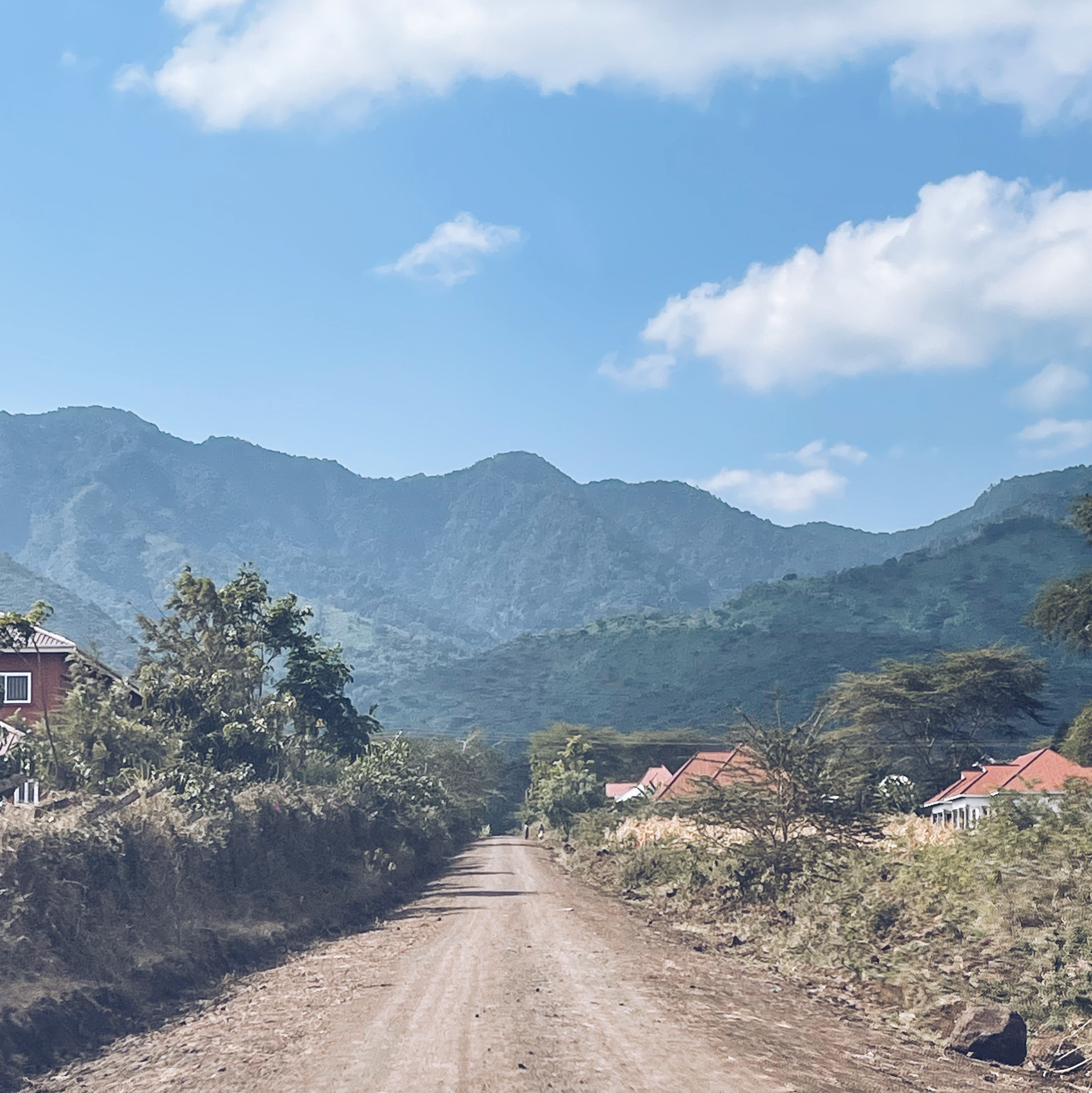
- From top to bottom: View of Monduli Mountains from Monduli Mjini
- Nickname: Monduli's capital
- Location within Tanzania
- Coordinates: 3°18′10.44″S 36°26′43.44″E
- Country: Tanzania
- Region: Arusha Region
- District: Monduli District

Area
  - Total: 2.543 km^{2} (0.982 sq mi)
- Elevation: 1,554 m (5,098 ft)

Population (2016)
  - Total: 8,699
- Demonym: Monduli towner

Ethnic groups
  - Settler: Swahili & Maasai
  - Ancestral: Hadza, Datooga & Iraqw
- Tanzanian Postal Code: 23401

Monduli Mjini (Kata na Mji wa Monduli in Swahili) is an administrative ward and district capital located in the Monduli District of the Arusha Region of Tanzania.The ward is totally surrounded by the Engototo ward. In 2016 the Tanzania National Bureau of Statistics report there were 8,699 people in the ward, from 7,796 in 2012. The average elevation of Monduli Mjini is 1,553m.

== Administration ==
The postal code for Monduli Mjini Ward is 23401. The ward is divided into the following neighborhoodss:

- Monduli Magharibi
- Monduli Mashariki
- Sabasaba
- Sisoni Kati

=== Government ===
The ward, like every other ward in the country, has local government offices based on the population served. The Monduli Mjini Ward administration building houses a court as per the Ward Tribunal Act of 1988, including other vital departments for the administration the ward. The ward has the following administration offices:

- Monduli Mjini Ward Police Station located in Kati neighbirhood
- Monduli Mjini Ward Government Office (Afisa Mtendaji, Kata ya Monduli Mjini) in Kati Neighborhood
- Karatu Ward Tribunal (Baraza La Kata) is a Department inside Ward Government Office

In the local government system of Tanzania, the ward is the smallest democratic unit. Each ward is composed of a committee of eight elected council members which include a chairperson, one salaried officer (with no voting rights), and an executive officer. One-third of seats are reserved for women councillors.

== Education and health ==
=== Education ===
The home to these educational institutions:

- Irkisongo Girls Secondary School
- Moringe Sokoine Secondary Teachers College
- Monduli Valley Primary School
- Emayani Engai Pre & Primary School
- Engarooj Primary School

=== Healthcare ===
The ward is home to the following health institutions:

- Marie Stopes Health Center
