= Moita (Tanzanian ward) =

Ward in Monduli, Arusha, Tanzania

Moita Kata ya Moita
- Ward
- Location within Tanzania
- Coordinates: 3.4864407°S 36.5650896°E
- Country: Tanzania
- Region: Arusha Region
- District: Monduli District
- Ward: Moita

Population (2016)
  - Total: 12,654
- Time zone: UTC+3 (EAT)

Moita is an administrative ward in the Monduli District of the Arusha Region of Tanzania. In 2016 the Tanzania National Bureau of Statistics report there were 12,654 people in the ward, from 11,340 in 2012.
