= Mswakini =

Ward of Monduli District in Arusha Region of Tanzania

Mswakini Ward Kata ya Mswakini (Swahili)
- Ward
- Kata ya Mswakini
- Location within Tanzania
- Country: Tanzania
- Region: Arusha Region
- District: Monduli District

Area
  - Total: 319.3 km^{2} (123.3 sq mi)
- Elevation: 1,017 m (3,337 ft)

Population (2012)
  - Total: 5,776
  - Density: 18.09/km^{2} (46.85/sq mi)

Mswakini is an administrative ward in the Monduli District of the Arusha Region of Tanzania. The ward covers an area of 319.3 km^{2} (123.3 sq mi), and has an average elevation of 1,017 m (3,337 ft). According to the 2012 census, the ward has a total population of 5,776.
