= Monduli Juu, Monduli District =

Ward in Monduli District, Arusha Region, Tanzania

Monduli Juu Kata ya Monduli Juu
- Ward
- Location within Tanzania
- Coordinates: 3.2991222°S 36.445283°E
- Country: Tanzania
- Region: Arusha Region
- District: Monduli District
- Ward: Monduli Juu

Population (2016)
  - Total: 12,457
- Time zone: UTC+3 (EAT)

Monduli Juu is an administrative ward in the Monduli District of the Arusha Region of Tanzania. In 2016 the Tanzania National Bureau of Statistics report there were 12,457 people in the ward, from 15,914 in 2012.
