= Lolkisale =

Ward of Monduli District, Arusha Region

Coordinates: 3°46′S 36°25′E

Lolkisale is an administrative ward in the Monduli district of the Arusha Region of Tanzania. According to the 2002 census, the ward has a total population of 10,179.
