= Lepurko =

Ward in Monduli District, Arusha Region

Lepurko Ward Kata ya Lepurko (Swahili)}
- Ward
- Kata ya Lepurko
- Location within Tanzania
- Country: Tanzania
- Region: Arusha Region
- District: Monduli District

Area
  - Total: 246.8 km^{2} (95.3 sq mi)
- Elevation: 1,395 m (4,577 ft)

Population (2012)
  - Total: 8,151
  - Density: 33.03/km^{2} (85.54/sq mi)

Lepurko is an administrative ward in the Monduli District of the Arusha Region of Tanzania. The ward covers an area of 246.8 km^{2} (95.3 sq mi), and has an average elevation of 1,463 m (4,800 ft). According to the 2012 census, the ward has a total population of 8,151.
