= Mrisho =

Mrisho is a Tanzanian name. Notable people with the name include:

- Mrisho Gambo, Tanzanian politician
- Mrisho Ngasa (born 1989), Tanzanian football player
- Zakia Mrisho Mohamed (born 1984), Tanzanian long-distance runner
