= Selela =

Ward in Monduli District, Arusha Region

Selela Kata ya Selela
- Ward
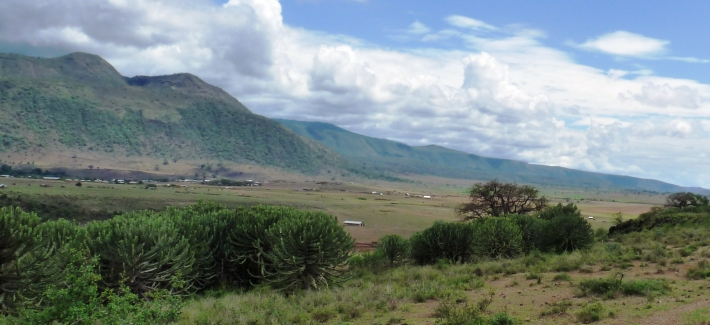
- View at Selela in the Rift Valley

- Location within Tanzania
- Coordinates: 3.205°S 35.944°E
- Country: Tanzania
- Region: Arusha Region
- District: Monduli District
- Ward: Selela

Population (2022)
  - Total: 14,275
- Time zone: UTC+3 (EAT)

Selela is the name of a village and an administrative ward in the Monduli District of the Arusha Region of Tanzania. The name Selela means Clean water in the Maasai language.

In 2022 the Tanzania National Bureau of Statistics report there were 14,275 people in the ward (55% female - 45% male; average household size: 4.3), from 9,712 in 2016 and 8,703 in 2012.

== Education ==
In Selela there are a number of schools:
- Selela Primary School is the largest and counts almost 1,200 children. .
- In the subvillage of Mbaash (which means 'between the mountains' in Maasai language), about 16 km from Selela, there's also primary school which counts more than 700 children. This is an official boarding school. The head teacher is Mr. Paakwai Meitamei.
- A third primary school is about 7 km from Selela village and is called Ndinyika Primary School, with more than children. Ndinyika means 'far from the boma' in Maasai language. .
- Oltinga Secondary School is built on the escarpment and overviews Selela village. This (boarding) school has grown quite rapidly in the last few years and now hosts around 800 students from the region around Selela. The name comes from the Maasai word for 'water basin', which is located near to the school. Head teacher is Mr. Kitali.

== Health ==
Selela has a dispensary and since 2016 a dispensary at Mbaash has opened as well. Selela and Mbaash are supported by Tanzania Support Foundation. This NGO, founded in The Netherlands, especially helped the Selela schools with several supplies (for example school desks, computers, books, exercise books, storage cupboards et cetera), but also construction materials for classrooms, teachers houses, dormitories and water storage units. Also laptops and tablets have been provided for the schools. Furthermore the medical dispensaries received, for example, medical supplies, wheelchairs, walkers and a solar installation.

== Economy ==
Every Wednesday there's a market day at Selela village. In the village there are some guesthouses and small shops.
