= Poli, Meru =

Ward in Meru District, Arusha Region

Coordinates: 3°20′S 36°48′E

Poli
- Ward
- Kata ya Poli
- Location within Tanzania
- Country: Tanzania
- Region: Arusha Region
- District: Meru District

Population
  - Total: 9,506

Poli is an administrative ward in the Meru District of the Arusha Region of Tanzania. Despite being one of the least populous wards in the district, Poli is home to Tumaini University Makumira and Makumira University College. Both institutions are located in the largest town in the ward, Makumira. According to the 2002 census, the ward has a total population of 8,659.
