= Josiah Kibira University College =

College in Bukoba, Tanzania

- Swahili: Chuo Kikuu Kishiriki cha Josiah Kibira
- Motto: Knowledge, Responsibility and Development
- Type: Private
- Established: 2008
- Affiliations: Lutheran
- Chairman: Bishop Elisa Buberwa
- Provost: Rev. Prof. Wilson Niwagila
- Location: Bukoba Rural, Tanzania
- Campus: Rural
- Constituent college of: Tumaini University Makumira
- Website: jokuco.ac.tz

Josiah Kibira University College (JoKUCo) is a constituent college of Tumaini University Makumira in Bukoba, Tanzania.
