= Meserani, Monduli =

Ward in Monduli District, Arusha Region

Meserani Ward Kata ya Meserani (Swahili)}
- Ward
- Kata ya Meserani
- Location within Tanzania
- Country: Tanzania
- Region: Arusha Region
- District: Monduli District

Area
  - Total: 650.9 km^{2} (251.3 sq mi)
- Elevation: 1,262 m (4,140 ft)

Population (2012)
  - Total: 11,301
  - Density: 17.36/km^{2} (44.97/sq mi)

Meserani is an administrative ward in the Monduli District of the Arusha Region of Tanzania. The ward covers an area of 650.9 km^{2} (251.3 sq mi), and has an average elevation of 1,463 m (4,800 ft). According to the 2012 census, the ward has a total population of 11,301.
