= Esilalei =

Ward in Monduli, Arusha, Tanzania

Esilalei Kata ya Esilalei
- Ward
- Location within Tanzania
- Coordinates: 3.48672°S 35.9342°E
- Country: Tanzania
- Region: Arusha Region
- District: Monduli District
- Established: 1984

Government
  - Type: Council
  - Chairman of Council: Murshid Hashim Ngeze

Area
  - Total: 496 km^{2} (192 sq mi)
- Elevation: 986 m (3,235 ft)

Population (2022)
  - Total: 29,020
  - Density: 58.5/km^{2} (152/sq mi)
- Time zone: EAT
- Area code: 027
- Website: District Website

Esilalei is an administrative ward in the Monduli district of the Arusha Region of Tanzania. The ward is composed of three villages, namely Esilalei, Losirwa and Oltukai. The ward covers an area of 496 square kilometres (192 sq mi) at an average altitude of 986 metres (3,235 ft).

Esilalei has experienced an exceptionally high population growth from 7,824 in 2002 to 29,020 in 2022.

The current Esilalei ward councilor is Mr. Lemia Murani (2020–Present).

Every Sunday there's a market day at Oltukai village. However, the villages of Esilalei and Losirwa both conduct their market day every Thursday. In these markets, the villagers are able to purchase all their necessities, including clothing, food, and livestock.
