= Sepeko =

Ward in Monduli, Arusha, Tanzania

Sepeko Kata ya Sepeko
- Ward
- Location within Tanzania
- Coordinates: 3.3916905°S 36.328802°E
- Country: Tanzania
- Region: Arusha Region
- District: Monduli District
- Ward: Sepeko

Population (2016)
  - Total: 13,550
- Time zone: UTC+3 (EAT)

Sepeko is an administrative ward in the Monduli District of the Arusha Region of Tanzania. In 2016 the Tanzania National Bureau of Statistics report there were 13,550 people in the ward, from 16,720 in 2012.
