= Engaruka =

National Historic Site of Tanzania

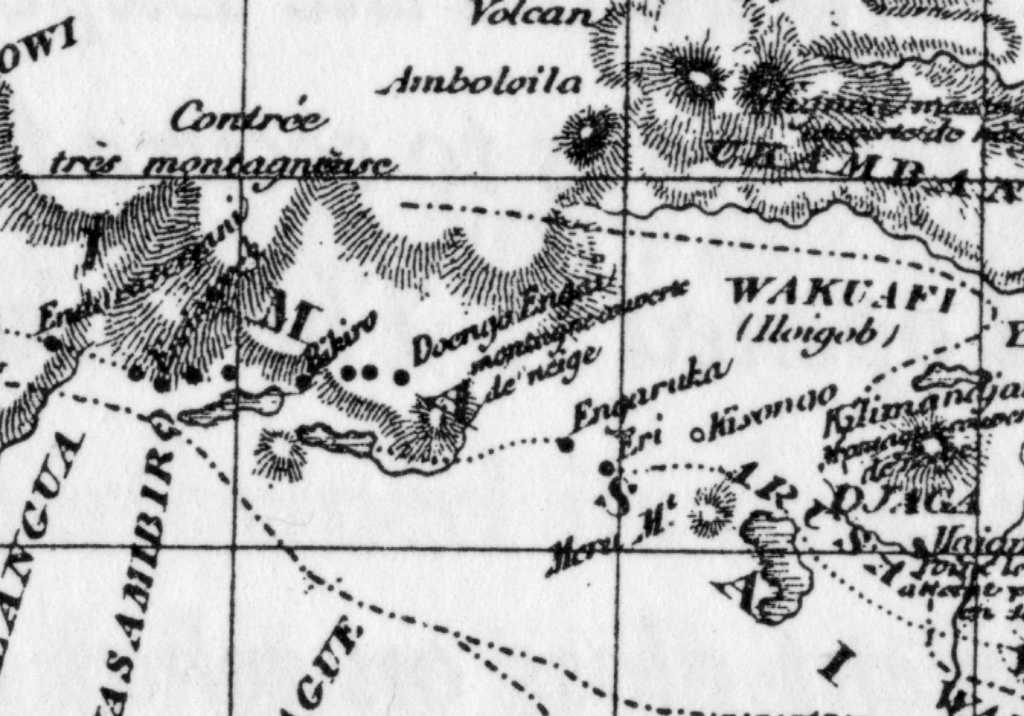
- Old Map of Engaruka Site

- Site location in Tanzania
- 2°58′58.80″S 35°57′0.00″E
- Type: Settlement
- Cultures: Iraqw & Sonjo
- Location: Monduli District, Arusha Region, Tanzania
- Region: Eastern Africa

Site notes
- Area: 20 km^{2} (215,278,208 sq ft)
- Excavation dates: 1913, 1935 & 2002
- Archaeologists: Hans Reck, Louis Leakey &Mary Leakey
- Condition: On-going excavation
- Owner: Tanzanian government
- Management: Antiquities Division, Ministry of Natural Resources and Tourism
- Public access: Yes

National Historic Sites of Tanzania
- Official name: Engaruka Irrigation Furrows

Engaruka is a system of ruins located in northwest Monduli District in central Arusha Region, inhabited between the 15th and 18th centuries. The site is in geographical range of the Great Rift Valley of northern Tanzania. Situated in the Monduli District, it is famed for its irrigation and cultivation structures. It is considered one of the most important Iron Age archaeological sites in Tanzania. The site is located in the ward of Engaruka. The site is registered as one of the National Historic Sites of Tanzania.

== The site ==
Sometime in the 15th century, an Iron Age farming community built a large continuous village area on the footslopes of the Rift Valley escarpment, housing several thousand people. They developed an intricate irrigation and cultivation system, involving a stone-block canal channeling water from the Crater Highlands rift escarpment to stone-lined cultivation terraces. Measures were taken to prevent soil erosion and the fertility of the plots was increased by using the manure of stall fed cattle. For an unknown reason Engaruka was abandoned at latest in the mid-18th century. The site still poses many questions, including the identity of the founders, how they developed their farming system, and why they left.

Construction of Engaruka has traditionally been credited to the ancestors of the Iraqw, a Cushitic-speaking group of cultivators residing in the Mbulu Highlands of northern Tanzania. The modern Iraqw practice an intensive form of self-contained agriculture that bears a remarkable similarity to the ruins of stone-walled canals, dams and furrows that are found at Engaruka. Iraqw historical traditions likewise relate that their last significant migration to their present area of inhabitation occurred about two or three centuries ago after conflicts with the Barbaig sub-group of the Datoga, herders who are known to have occupied the Crater Highlands above Engaruka prior to the arrival of the Maasai. This population movement is reportedly consistent with the date of the Engaruka site's desertion, which is estimated at somewhere between 1700 and 1750. It also roughly coincides with the start of the diminishment of the Engaruka River's flow as well as those of other streams descending from the Ngorongoro highlands; water sources around which Engaruka's irrigation practices were centered. According to the Maasai, who are the present-day occupants of Engaruka, the Iraqw also already inhabited the site when their own ancestors first entered the region during the 18th century.

Engaruka has also been linked to the Sonjo, a numerically small Bantu-speaking living some 60 miles to the northwest. Like the Iraqw, they are known for their use of irrigation systems in agriculture. The Sonjo also maintain terraced village sites, albeit of considerably more rudimentary form than what is found at Engaruka. New studies have also revealed new information about the Middle Stone Age and Pastoral Neolithic occupational histories of the area.

The settled irrigation agriculture system represented at Engaruka has strong and detailed parallels with that of the Sonjo who live farther north in this section of the Rift Valley, near Lake Natron. These similarities include overall village structure, house place- ment and construction, and ceremonial outdoor hearth design, indicating the Sonjo agricultural settlement system has a respectable antiquity.

— Christopher Ehret, The Archaeological and Linguistic Reconstruction of African History,

== History of archaeological research ==
The first European to record the existence of these ruins was Gustav Fischer, who passed them on 5 July 1883, and compared them to the tumbled-down walls of ancient castles. Scoeller and Kaiser mentioned the ruins of "Ngaruku" including great stone circles and dams in 1896–97. The first detailed and archaeological investigation was by Hans Reck, in 1913. Louis Leakey and Mary Leakey investigated the site in 1935, but were disappointed by the lack of burial sites. They estimated a population of 30,000, but this figure is now considered exaggerated.

John Sutton of the British Institute in Eastern Africa later conducted excavations at Engaruka, and in 2002–2005 Ari Siiriainen led a research team from the Department of Archaeology at the University of Helsinki. In 2001–2004, studies were conducted by Daryl Stump of University College London as part of his PhD thesis work. In 2006, the University of Helsinki resumed Siiriainen's work, concentrating on the connections between Engaruka and the Sonjo area.

== Modern Engaruka ==
Engaruka is also the name of a modern village not far from the archaeological site.

The Maasai conduct tourist tours of the site.

== See also ==
- Engaruka Collection of excerpts from different sources, by the nTZ, Northern Tanzania Information Resource
- Maps, Weather, and Airports for Engaruka, Tanzania, United Rep. of Weather graphs.
- Nurse, Derek & Franz Rottland. 1991. ‘Sonjo: Description, Classification, History’, in Sprache und Geschichte in Afrika, 12/13, 171–289.
- Westerberg, L.-O., Holmgren, K., Börjeson, L., Håkansson, N.T., Laulumaa, V., Ryner, M., and Öberg, H., 2010: The development of the ancient irrigation system at Engaruka, Northern Tanzania: Physical and societal factors. The Geographical Journal, doi: 10.1111/j.1475-4959.2010.00370.x
