= Makumira =

Town in Poli ward, Meru District, Arusha Region

Coordinates: 3.37479827°S 36.828739414°E

Makumira is a small town located in Poli ward of Meru District in Arusha Region of northern Tanzania. It lies on the slope of Mount Meru, the fifth-highest mountain in Africa. Makumira is about 16 kilometres from the city of Arusha on the main road, A23. The neighboring villages are Tengeru and Usa River.

Makumira is growing due to the presence of Makumira University College, the local branch of Tumaini University, which is run by the Evangelical Lutheran Church of Tanzania (ELCT).

Transport in the town is mainly by dala dala.

The biggest tribe in this small town is the Meru tribe. The village is growing gradually due to the presence of students at Tumaini University Makumira, and becoming wealthier as a center of business.
