= Sonjo language =

Bantu language spoken in northern Tanzania

Sonjo
- Gitemi
- Native to: Tanzania
- Region: Arusha Region, Ngorongoro District, near the Kenyan border
- Ethnicity: Sonjo people
- Native speakers: 24,600 (2009)
- Language family: Niger–Congo?: Atlantic–Congo; Volta-Congo; Benue–Congo; Bantoid; Southern Bantoid; Bantu; Northeast Bantu; Kikuyu–Kamba; Sonjo

Language codes
- ISO 639-3: soz
- Glottolog: temi1247
- Guthrie code: E.46

- Person: Msonjo (Batɛmi)
- People: Wasonjo (Motɛmi)
- Language: Kisonjo (Ketɛmi)

Sonjo, or Temi, is a Bantu language spoken in northern Tanzania, 30–40 miles (48–64 km) west of Lake Natron. Ethnolinguistically, it is a displaced member of Guthrie’s E50 group, most other members of which are found in Central Kenya. Within that group, it is most closely related to Gikuyu. The Sonjo people number about 30,000 (2002 SIL); many of them are bilingual in Swahili, the local language of education. Sonjo is largely undescribed.

The Sonjo have lived for centuries as an isolated enclave in Maasai territory. They are known for their use of irrigation systems in agriculture, a rare trait which causes some historians to link them to the hitherto unexplained ruined irrigation systems of Engaruka, 60 miles (97 km) to the southeast. The term Sonjo is the name given to the people by the Maasai; they call themselves batɛmi (sg. motɛmi) and their language ketɛmi. Apart from inevitable Maasai (Eastern Nilotic) influence, Sonjo shows influence from Chaga (Bantu E40), various Southern Cushitic languages, and from Datooga.
