= Ngurdoto Crater =

Volcanic crater in Arusha Region, Tanzania

- Kasoko la Ngurdoto (Swahili)
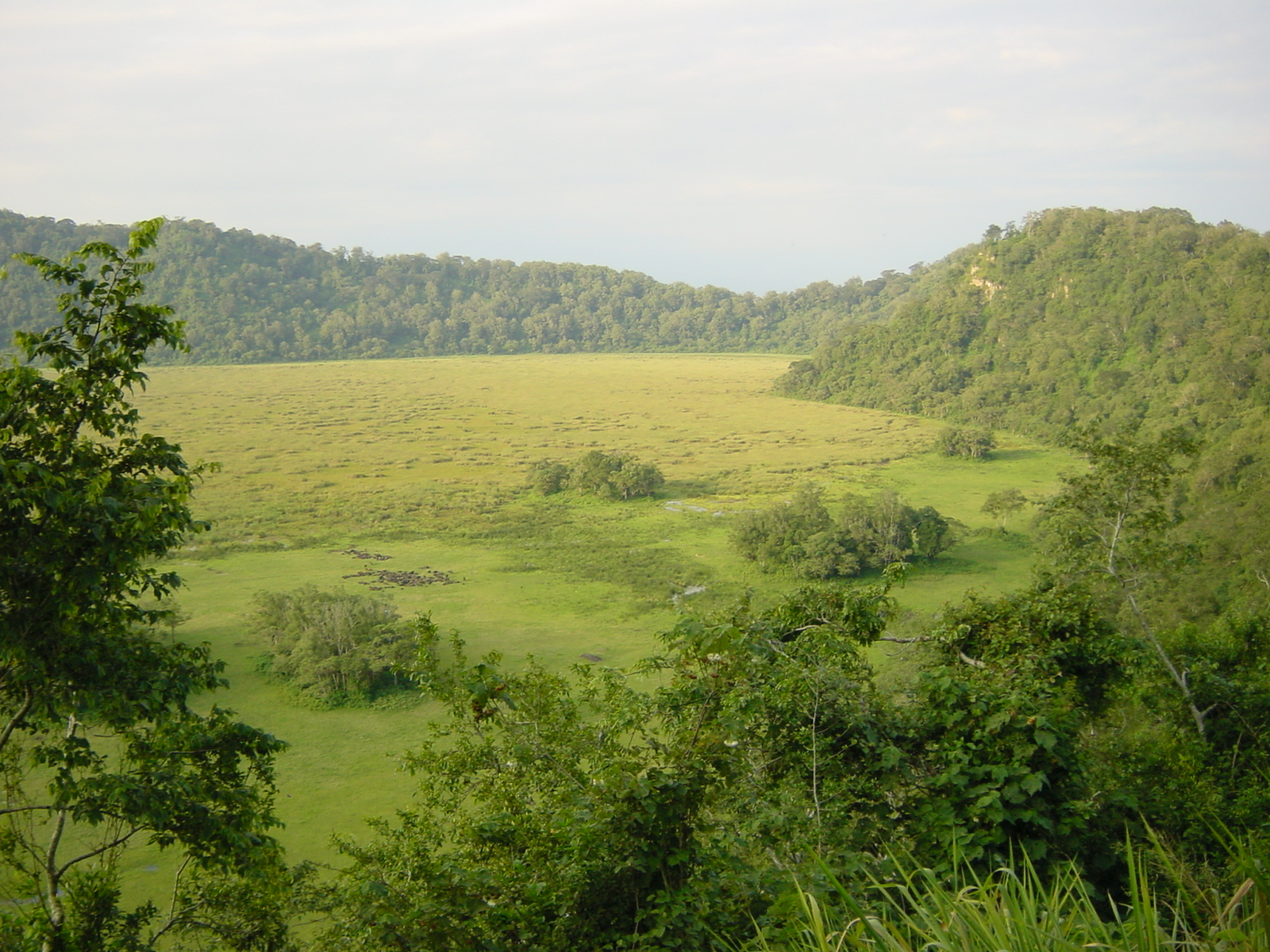
- Ngurdoto Crater from southern rim

Highest point
- Elevation: 3,250 m (10,660 ft)
- Parent peak: Mount Meru
- Coordinates: 3°17′20″S 36°55′36″E

Dimensions
- Length: 3.6 km (2.2 mi) north-south

Geography
- Country: Tanzania
- Region: Arusha Region
- District: Meru District

Geology
- Mountain type: Volcanic
- Volcanic zone: Great Rift Valley

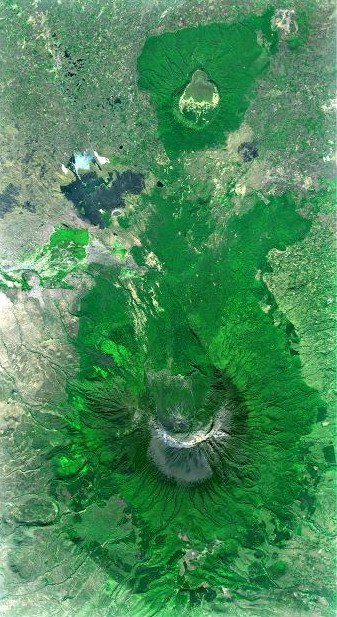
Mount Meru volcano and Ngurdoto Crater (image top) from space (East is at the top)

Ngurdoto Crater is a volcanic crater in Meru District, Arusha Region, Tanzania. The crater is 3.6 km (2.2 mi) in diameter at its widest and 100 metres (110 yd) deep. Ngurdoto Crater is surrounded by forest whilst the crater floor is a swamp. It is located in Arusha National Park.

== Environment ==
=== Climate change ===
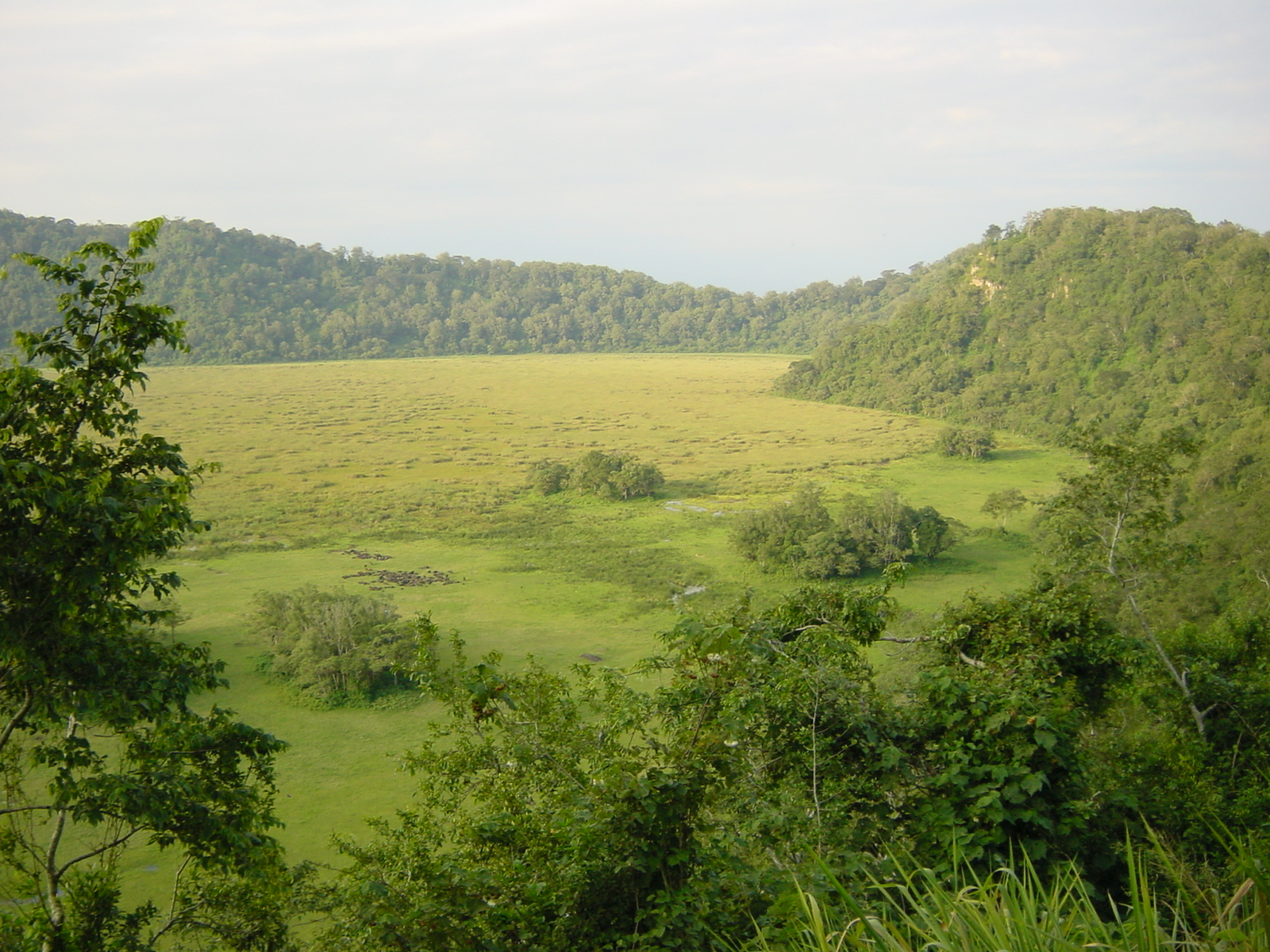
Ngurdoto Crater at Arusha National Park in Tanzania, East Africa

Between 1981 and 2016 there are marked areas of drying in parts of northeast and much of southern Tanzania. A clear warming trend is apparent in annual temperature. By the 2090s projected warming is in the range of 1.6 to 5.0 °C, also evenly distributed across the country. For rainfall there is strong agreement for decreases in the mean number of rain days and increases in the amount of rainfall on each rainy day (the ‘rainfall intensity’). Taken together these changes suggest more variable rainfall, with both higher likelihood of dry spells (such as droughts) and a higher likelihood of intense rainfall events (often associated with flooding). Climate change impacts of severe droughts, floods, livestock deaths, crop failures and outbreak of disease (such as cholera and malaria) are likely to be regularly observed.
