= Engutoto, Monduli =

Ward in Monduli District, Arusha Region

Engutoto Ward Kata ya Engutoto (Swahili)}
- Ward
- Kata ya Engutoto
- Location within Tanzania
- Country: Tanzania
- Region: Arusha Region
- District: Monduli District

Area
  - Total: 31.66 km^{2} (12.22 sq mi)
- Elevation: 1,578 m (5,177 ft)

Population (2012)
  - Total: 6,970
  - Density: 220/km^{2} (570/sq mi)

Engutoto is an administrative ward in the Monduli District of the Arusha Region of Tanzania. The ward covers an area of 31.66 km^{2} (12.22 sq mi), and has an average elevation of 1,578 m (5,177 ft). According to the 2012 census, the ward has a total population of 6,970.
