= Godbless Lema =

Tanzanian politician

Honourable Godbless Lema MP

Member of Parliament for Arusha City
- Incumbent
- Assumed office November 2010
- Preceded by: Felix Mrema
- Succeeded by: Mrisho Gambo

Personal details
- Born: Godbless Jonathan Lema; 26 October 1976 (age 49)
- Party: CHADEMA
- Children: 3

Godbless Jonathan Lema (born 26 October 1976) is a Tanzanian Chadema politician and Member of Parliament for Arusha City constituency from 2010 to 2015. He was also a candidate for the same constituency in the 2015 general election which was conducted on 25 October 2015. However, the parliamentary election for Arusha Constituency had to be postponed following the death of Estomoh Malya who was the parliamentary candidate for the Alliance for Change and Transparency, a newly established opposition political party in Tanzania.

The by-election was scheduled for 13 December 2015 and Lema was expected to win since Arusha is one of the Chadema strongholds. In the October 2015 general election, his party won 23 out of 24 members of the Arusha City Council. Lema has been vocal and well known following his activists politics against the ruling Chama cha Mapinduzi. He led a number of political rallies and protests against the government and CCM, some of which resulted in serious injuries and deaths after fierce police confrontation. However, his leadership increased Chadema popularity in the Northern City of Arusha and for the first time, its council is led by the opposition.

In 2020 he moved to Canada as a refugee, after being arrested without cause in a government crackdown on the opposition Chadema party following the 2020 Tanzanian general election.

In March 2023, Lema returned to Tanzania from exile, about a month after senior CHADEMA figure Tundu Lissu, another former MP, also returned from exile abroad. Their return followed an announcement by President Samia Suluhu Hassan lifting a ban on political assembly imposed by her predecessor, the late John Magufuli. News reports also suggested that the government might drop a case against Lema; he had been charged with unspecified crimes after the 2020 Tanzanian general election, which opposition parties had rejected as illegitimate.
