= Mto wa Mbu =

Ward and town in Monduli, Arusha, Tanzania

Coordinates: 3.35°S 35.85°E

- Ward
- Kata ya Mto wa Mbu
- Location within Tanzania
- Country: Tanzania
- Region: Arusha Region
- District: Monduli District

Population
  - Total: 11,405

Mto wa Mbu is an administrative ward and town in the Monduli district of the Arusha Region of Tanzania. According to the 2012 census, the ward had a total population of 11,405. The name Mto wa Mbu means " The river of Mosquitoes " in the Swahili Language.

== Geography ==
Mto wa Mbu has an area of 3,600 square kilometres (1,400 sq mi) of which 1,800 square kilometres (690 sq mi) is for cultivation.. Mto wa Mbu is estimated to be in the midway between the neighbouring Karatu and Makuyuni towns. It is one of the towns in the rift valley in the northern part of Tanzania. It close to lake Manyara and Manyara national park.

== Economy ==
The town of Mto wa Mbu features lodges, rest houses and camp sites for tourists who visit Lake Manyara and Manyara national park. Banana is the common and largest agricultural product in the town and the surrounding area. Mto wa Mbu is can be reached by driving from Arusha. It is approximately 112 km from Arusha city and the road is well repaired with tarmac. Tourists vehicles from Arusha, Nairobi, Moshi and Babati always passes through this town on the way to Ngorongoro crater and Serengeti national park.
