= Engaruka, Monduli =

Ward in Monduli District, Arusha Region, Tanzania

Coordinates: 2°59′S 35°57′E

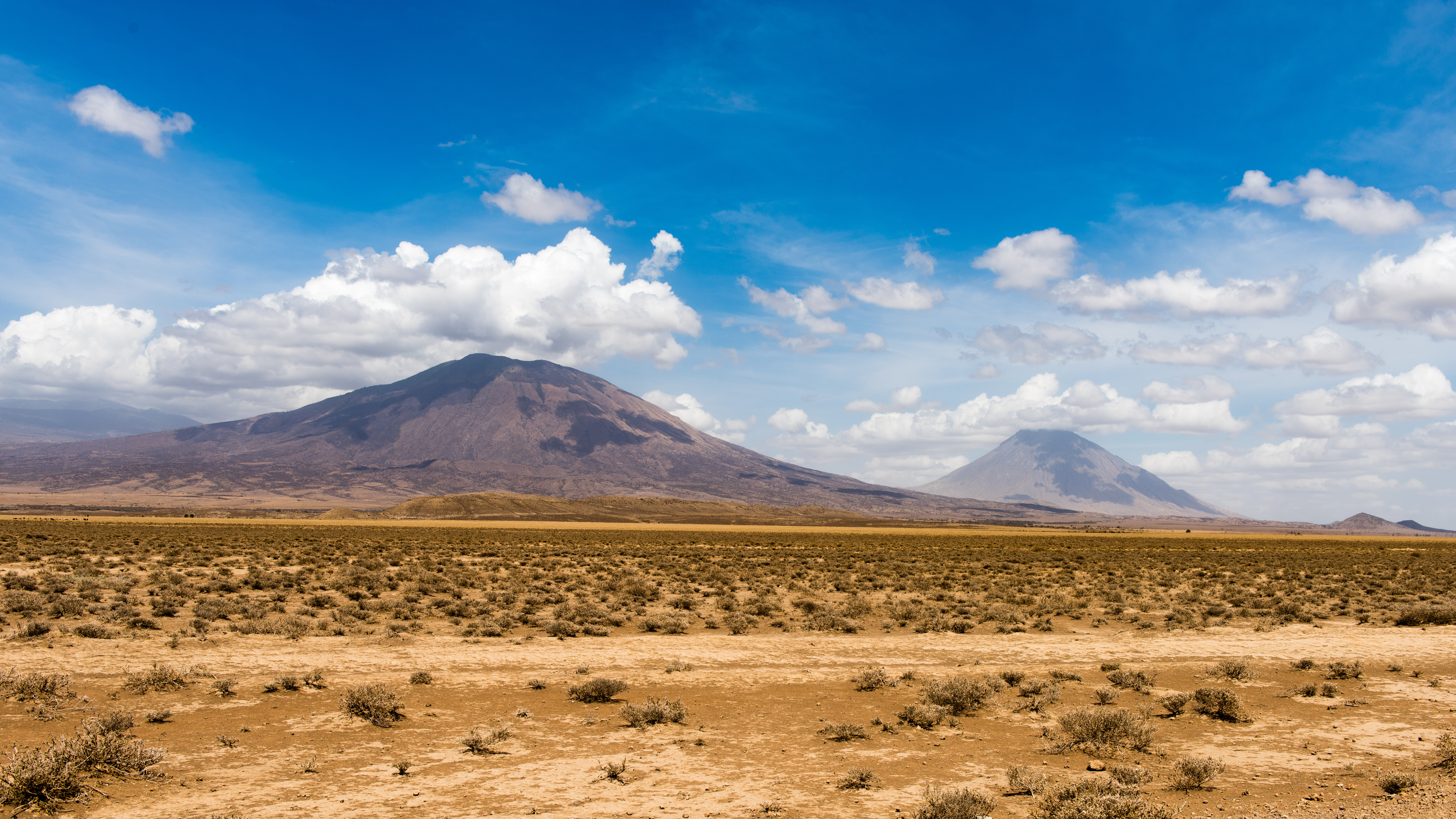
Vulcanoes in the Rift Valley (Ol Doinyo Lengai in the background), Tanzania

Engaruka is an administrative ward in the Monduli district of the Arusha Region of Tanzania. According to the 2002 census, the ward has a total population of 7,295.
