= Mrisho Gambo =

Tanzanian politician

Honorable Mrisho Gambo MP

Member of Parliament
- In office November 2020 – October 2025
- President: John Magufuli
- Preceded by: Godbless Lema
- Succeeded by: Paul Makonda

Personal details
- Born: Arusha Region, Tanzania
- Party: Chama Cha Mapinduzi
- Education: Boma Primary School, Kibaha Secondary School, Tanga Technical School
- Alma mater: Institute of Accountancy Arusha, Coventry University

Mrisho Mashaka Gambo (born in Arusha) is a Tanzanian CCM politician and Member of Parliament presently serves Arusha Urban Constituency since November 2020. He was also a District Commissioner and Regional Commissioner for the Arusha Region replaced by Iddi Kimanta.
