= Tumaini University Makumira =

University in Meru District, Arusha Region, Tanzania

Coordinates: 3°22′16″S 36°49′42″E

- Chuo Kikuu cha Tumaini Makumira (Swahili)
- Former name: Lutheran Theological College Makumira
- Motto: Research. Teaching. Service.
- Type: Private
- Established: 1997; 29 years ago
- Affiliations: Evangelical Lutheran Church in Tanzania
- Chairperson: Esther Mwaikambo
- Chancellor: Frederick Shoo
- Vice-Chancellor: Joseph Parsalaw
- Location: Makumira, Poli, Meru District, Arusha Region, Tanzania
- Campus: Makumira
- Website: University Website

Tumaini University Makumira (TUMA) is a private university located in the town of Makumira, Poli ward, Meru District of Arusha Region in north Tanzania. Its 2017 ranking at the Webometrics Ranking of World for Tanzania is position 10.

== Constituent colleges ==
The university has the following 5 constituent colleges and training centre:

1. Kilimanjaro Christian Medical University College(KCMUCo)
2. Tumaini University Dar es Salaam College (TUDARCo)
3. Stephano Moshi Memorial University College (SMMUCo)
4. Josiah Kibira University College (JoKUCo) was launched January 2013
5. TUMA-Mbeya Centre

== See also ==
- Category:Tumaini University Makumira alumni
