= Sonjo people =

Ethnic group from Arusha Region of Tanzania

Sonjo
Wasonjo

Total population
- 30,000

Regions with significant populations
- Tanzania Arusha Region (Ngorongoro District)

Languages
- Sonjo language & Swahili

Religion
- Christian; African Traditional Religion

Related ethnic groups
- Chagga, Kamba people & other Bantu peoples

- Person: Msonjo (Batɛmi)
- People: Wasonjo (Motɛmi)
- Language: Kisonjo (Ketɛmi)

The Sonjo or Batemi (Wasonjo, in Swahili) are a Bantu ethnic group from northern Ngorongoro District of Arusha Region in Tanzania.

== Overview ==
In 2002, the Sonjo population was estimated to number around 30,000 individuals (Ethnologue). The term Sonjo is the name given to the people by the Maasai. Group members prefer to call themselves the Batemi people.

The Sonjo people speak Sonjo, a Bantu language. They refer to it as Kitemi or Gitemi. The language's closest living cousins are those found around Mount Kenya (Meru, Kikuyu, Embu). They dwell in six communities in northern Tanzania, on the hills between the upper and lower western escarpments of the Rift Valley, above Lake Natron. The climate is semi-arid, with an annual rainfall of 400–600 mm. This is focused in two wet seasons, March–April and November–December. There were records of a maximum of 752 millimetres and a minimum of 508 millimetres throughout an eight-year period in the 1950s, when rainfall was above average.

Sonjoland is administratively part of Arusha Region's Ngorongoro District. The District Headquarters are currently located at Loliondo, 20 kilometers to the north-west across the hills from the main Sonjo villages (as the crow flies). The area was historically part of the ancestral land of the Sonjo. Sonjo left Hajaro in 1987 owing to hostility from the Maasai. The Maasai renamed it Pinyinyi. Wards in Monduli district like Orokhata were renamed Sale. The Sonjo names are only used when speaking in ki-Sonjo or referring to the former village site.

== History ==
Fosbrooke in 1938 defined the Sonjo as "an island of agricultural Bantu in a sea of nomadic Masai". Although the Maasai currently irrigate in Pagasi (where some Sonjo also live) and Peninyi, the irrigation of the Sonjo is a notable aspect of an otherwise pastoral area. In 1963, Robert Gray published the only comprehensive study of the Sonjo as "an irrigation-based society".

Sonjo have moved in and out of Peninyi during the last few decades. Sonjo are claimed to have arrived in the 1950s by current (Maasai) locals. Glynn Isaac and Richard Leakey's 'Sonjo Expedition' in 1963-64 (to examine Pleistocene fossiliferous strata) discovered Sonjo living and cultivating at Peninyi. In the 1970s and 1980s, a Sonjo settlement coexisted with the Maasai, and a school was established in 1978; by 1984, the Sonjo at Peninyi numbered over 1500 people). However, they left the area in 1987 after deadly clashes with Maasai over pasture.

Old Sonjo communities were compact and fortified, standing on strong defensive locations on hillsides above the neighboring plains, surrounded by impenetrable thorn thickets, and secured by many wooden stake entrances. Nyerere's ujamaa program (rural'socialism' and villagization) in the 1970s had a considerable impact on Sonjo settlement patterns. Ironically, given that one purpose of the initiative was to concentrate scattered populations, such 'villagization' pushed Sonjo, in 1975, to migrate out of their tight sites into the flatter lands below. To promote this migration, the old settlements were set on fire. In the case of Digodigo Jigo, the residents relocated 500 meters east of the creek from which their irrigation water was drawn, and named the area Moholo.

== Demographics ==
There were approximately 18,000 Sonjo in the mid-1980s. In the 1960s and 1970s, the population seemed to have expanded relatively quickly. The 1928 census counted 2,300 Sonjo and the 1957 census counted 4,400, but both may have been undercounted. Incomplete data collected in 1991 indicate that population expansion has continued, with the current amount estimated to be around 25,000.

== Culture ==
Each Sonjo village is a separate entity, and there are no governmental mechanisms that connect Sonjo from different villages. Nonetheless, they had and continue to share a great sense of belonging together. A major feature of this connection and their identity as "the Sonjo" is in their religious tradition.

The group of traditional leaders (singular mwenamijie, plural wenamijie) who govern the usage of irrigation water, arable land, and trees is the most visible political organization in each community. Water control is the most valuable political power one can have because the economy is reliant on irrigated agriculture. One of the community leaders stated that whomever controls the water controls the entire town.

The wenamijie make choices collaboratively, and the post is hereditary in the sense that a dead mwenamijie's disciple is chosen from his tribe. Each village also has a priest, who works closely with the wenamijie and plays no significant political role. The Sonjo use an age-grade system similar to the Maasai. Especially, the age- group of the warriors tended to play a large political role in the past. Today, as ethnic tensions between the Sonjo and the Maasai have subsided, the political relevance of the warriors has waned.

=== Religion ===
==== Ghambageu, the central figure in Sonjo mythology and religion ====
The most important figure in Sonjo mythology is Ghambageu, an apotheosized cultural hero. If one relies on the Sonjo age-grade lists, one can estimate that he lived around 400 years ago. There is no single version of his life, but there are multiple, depending on the narrator and the moment of telling. Simeon Ndula narrated Ghambageu's life before 1955, which is the oldest reported full version. Ndula was the main messenger for the British authority in Loliondo and was most likely the first Sonjo to be baptized. The following is a description of the Ndula version:

Ghambageu appeared in the world without a mother or father. He was a poor man from Tinaga who worked as a babysitter. He refused to help with the collective labor of repairing the irrigation channels and played tricks on the Tinaga residents. The Tinagans became enraged with him and intended to murder him. Ghambageu learned of the plot and treated a blind old lady before transporting her to the village of Samunge. Tinagans followed Ghambageu into Samunge. He persuaded the people of Samunge to support him by shooting burning bird feathers towards Tinagans. That had a terrible effect, and Tinagans fled, while the people of his new village saw him as a God as a result.

Ghambageu settled in Samunge as the hero and the leader, married, and got so many children that he no longer could endure with them. He transformed his children into stones, except two of his sons, of whom he later exiled one. Only his favorite son Aka remained. Aka decided to flee his father one night, so he transformed into a bird and flew away. This upset Ghambageu so much that he decided to leave Samunge and move to Kisangiro.

When Ghambageu died, he insisted on being laid out on a flat stone to dry in the sun rather than buried. The Kisangiro people, on the other hand, buried him. When the Samunge villagers learnt of Ghambageu's death, they hurried to Kisangiro and demanded that the burial be opened. Except for Ghambageu's footwear, the burial was discovered to be empty. As a result, they assumed he had risen from the grave. Ghambageu is expected to return at the end of time to save all Sonjo.

Ghambageu, according to the wenamijie, created their leadership. For those who seek to call the wenamijie's religious, political, and economic leadership into doubt, there are two options: either cut the link between the wenamijie and Ghambageu or discredit Ghambageu. The churches have opted for the latter option. However, the wenamijie have not been passive in the face of their challenge.

On the outskirts of Samunge, adjacent to the road leading to the neighboring village of Digodigo, there lies a stone under a thatched roof. Passers-by left grass as a sacrifice on the stone. This stone, according to one belief, is one of the children who were turned into stones.

A Lutheran mission among the Sonjo began in 1947 with the use of African resources, and an American-led Roman Catholic mission arrived in 1952. The wenamijie viewed Christian mission as a threat to the Sonjo culture and society's unity and continuance.

For six decades, Christian missions have labored among the Sonjo in northern Tanzania. Despite this, there are extremely few Christian converts. However, Christian doctrines have been completely integrated into Sonjo traditional religion. Ghambageu, the apotheosized Sonjo cultural hero, has grown in importance in Sonjo religion to the point where it appears to be on the verge of a unique monotheistic. Ghambegeu's personality has become more like that of Jesus. Eventually, these two holy figures will be merged together. Sonjo traditional leaders have taken an active role in this process. Their actions can be considered sensible in terms of sustaining Sonjo social and cultural stability.

== Agriculture and Sonjo irrigation systems ==
The Sonjo are known for their use of irrigation systems in agriculture. They have consequently been linked by some historians with the Engaruka complex, situated some 60 miles to the southeast. However, Engaruka systems predates arrival of Sonjo by many centuries. The Sonjo also maintain terraced village sites, albeit of considerably more rudimentary form than what is found at Engaruka.

Gravity irrigation is used at Sonjo, with simple unlined canals. There are two main sources of irrigation water used. The first is made up of springs that are utilised either directly as they rise at the base of the escarpment or after they have been consolidated into little streams. The second water source is the much larger Lelessuta River and its tributaries in the main valley (the Juhe). The task of maintaining canals and dams is organized and managed by an institutionalized group of elders (wenamiji) in each community, with the labor mostly the responsibility of young men (batana).

Sonjo economy and society (as well as Sonjo irrigation) have undergone a variety of changes over time. In recent decades, there has been a significant exodus from the main Sonjo villages to what appear to be permanent communities some distance distant.

There has been changes in Sonjo livestock management, and hence ties between the Sonjo and nearby Maasai pastoralists, have also occurred in the recent three decades. The Sonjo had many goats but no cattle until the 1960s, with the typical rationale being that having cattle would provide Maasai with an excuse to raid Sonjo territory and seize the stock. But, since then, the Sonjo have started rearing cattle in large numbers without suffering too much from Maasai attacks (save in the outlying districts of Peninyi and Masusu during the late-1980s assaults).

When it comes to farming, there is a definite gender division of labor. Men clear and burn fields, while women cultivate and sow the soil. Men irrigate, and women harvest and transport the crop. Irrigated land is classified into two types. Magare is a light sandy terrain that is well-drained and often sloping, and it is planted primarily in March, as the rains begin, and harvested in June, when they cease. During this time, most magare receives supplemental irrigation as needed. Gray believes that magare land is cultivated on alternating years, and our observations likely to back this up.

″Hura" land, on the other hand, is more central, conceptually if not geographically, and more heavily utilised. The soil is a thicker, darker (occasionally black) alluvial loam with a high silt/clay concentration. It is low-lying, frequently occurring in river and stream floodplains. It is relatively fruitful, and tends to be farmed every year. It is always watered. It is produced communally by women during the Mbaribari ceremony in September, and is harvested in theory in February. Ratooning can yield a second sorghum harvest two months later. In actuality, however, some hura land is cultivated more or less consistently.

The old grains sorghum was produced more extensively than finger millet (which is less susceptible of water-logging), serving as the principal staple, as it still does in many Sonjo homes today, despite the introduction of maize and the root carbohydrates cassava and sweet potato. Other bean cultivars, banana, maize, cucurbits, cabbage, lettuce, tomatoes, tobacco, papaya, and in a few areas mango, lime, and lemon are also produced presently, having been introduced since the 1960s. Many of these crops, however, are farmed by a small group of individuals, primarily younger farmers, those who have worked extensively outside Sonjo, and strangers such as church employees. Calabashes are another important crop that appears to be well-established, and its sale to Maasai (as receptacles, particularly for milk) is a significant source of wealth. Cassava is now widely grown and is planted extremely densely.
