= Arusha Region =

Region of Tanzania

Arusha Region Mkoa wa Arusha (Swahili)
- Region
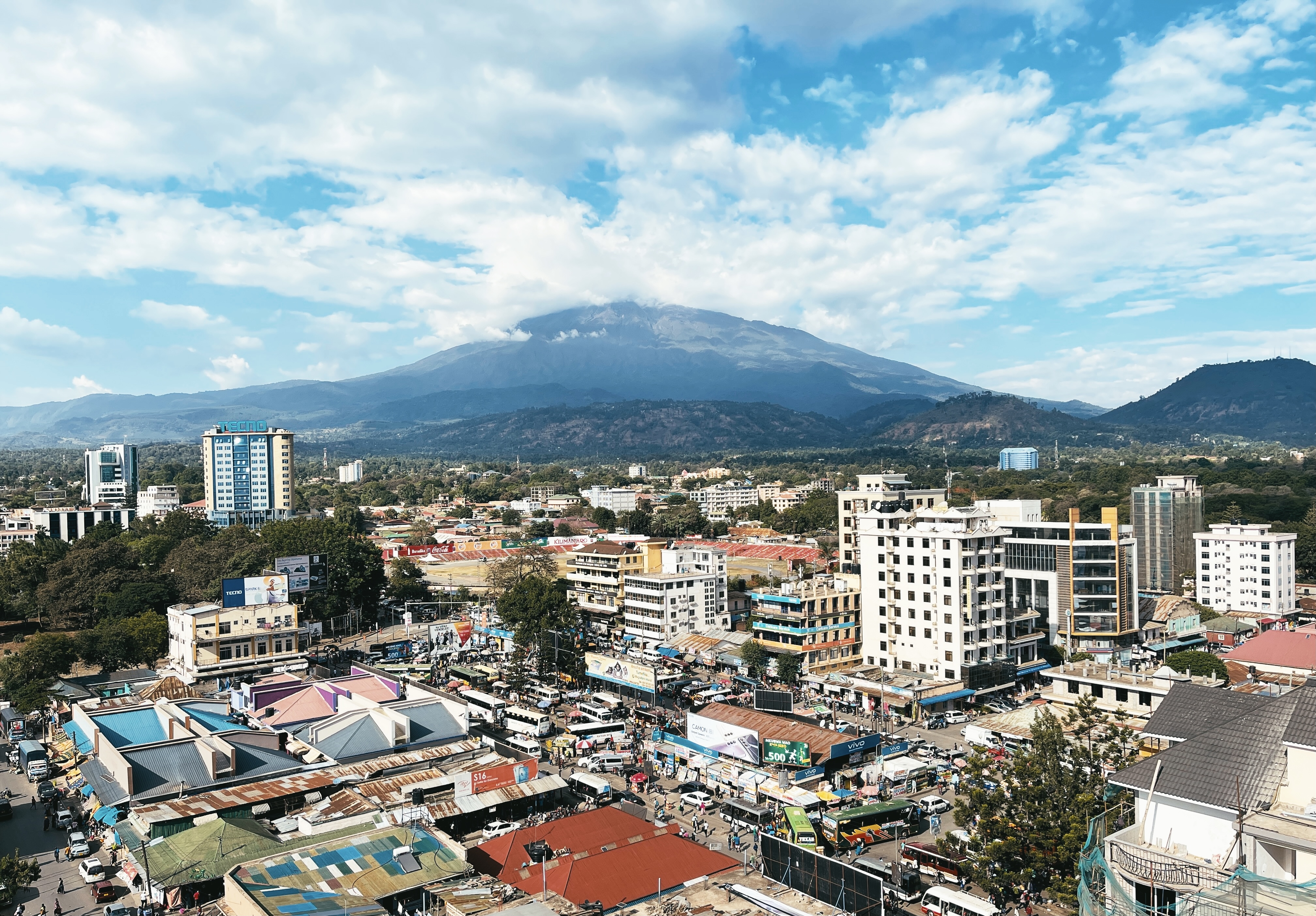
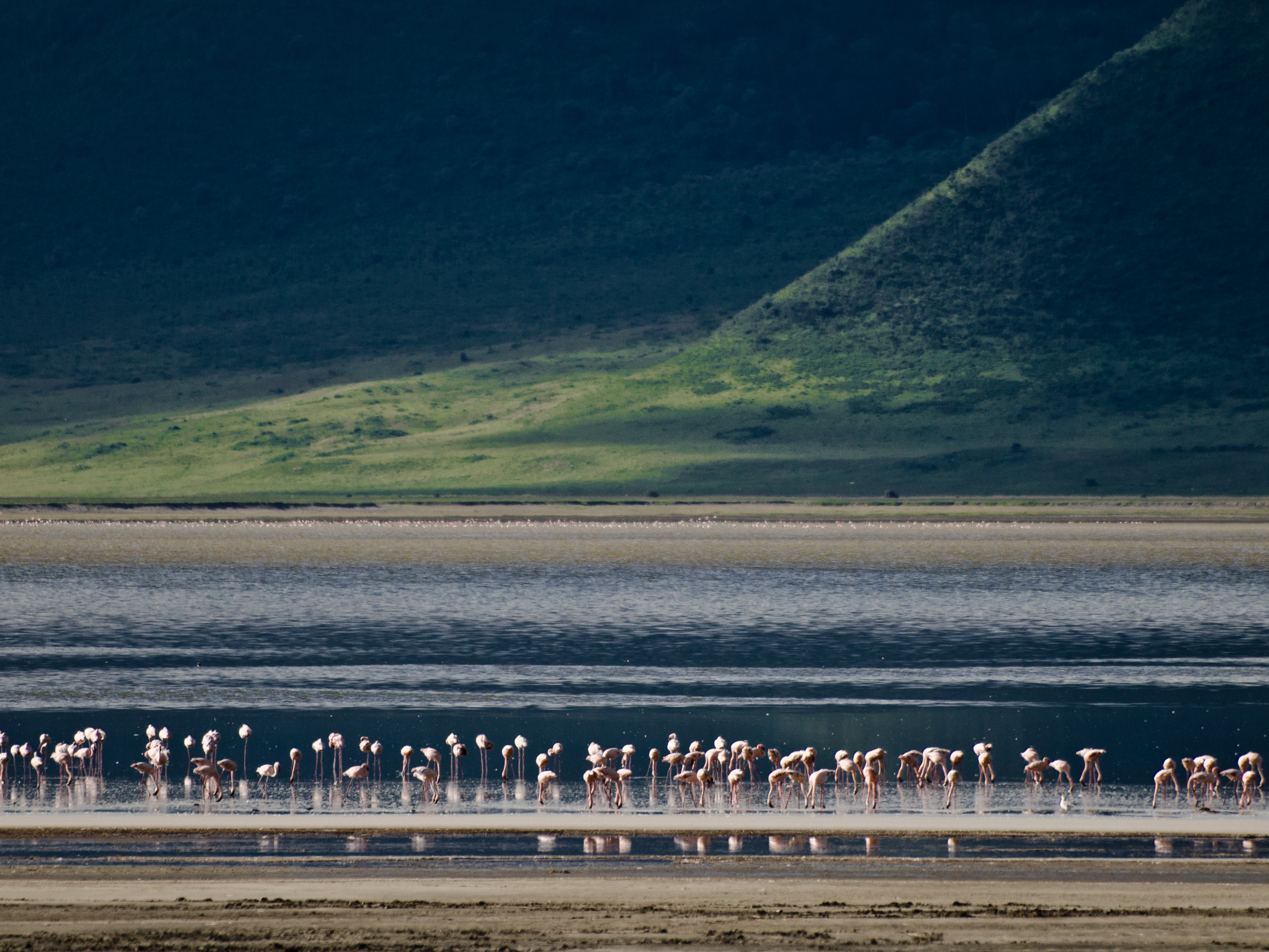
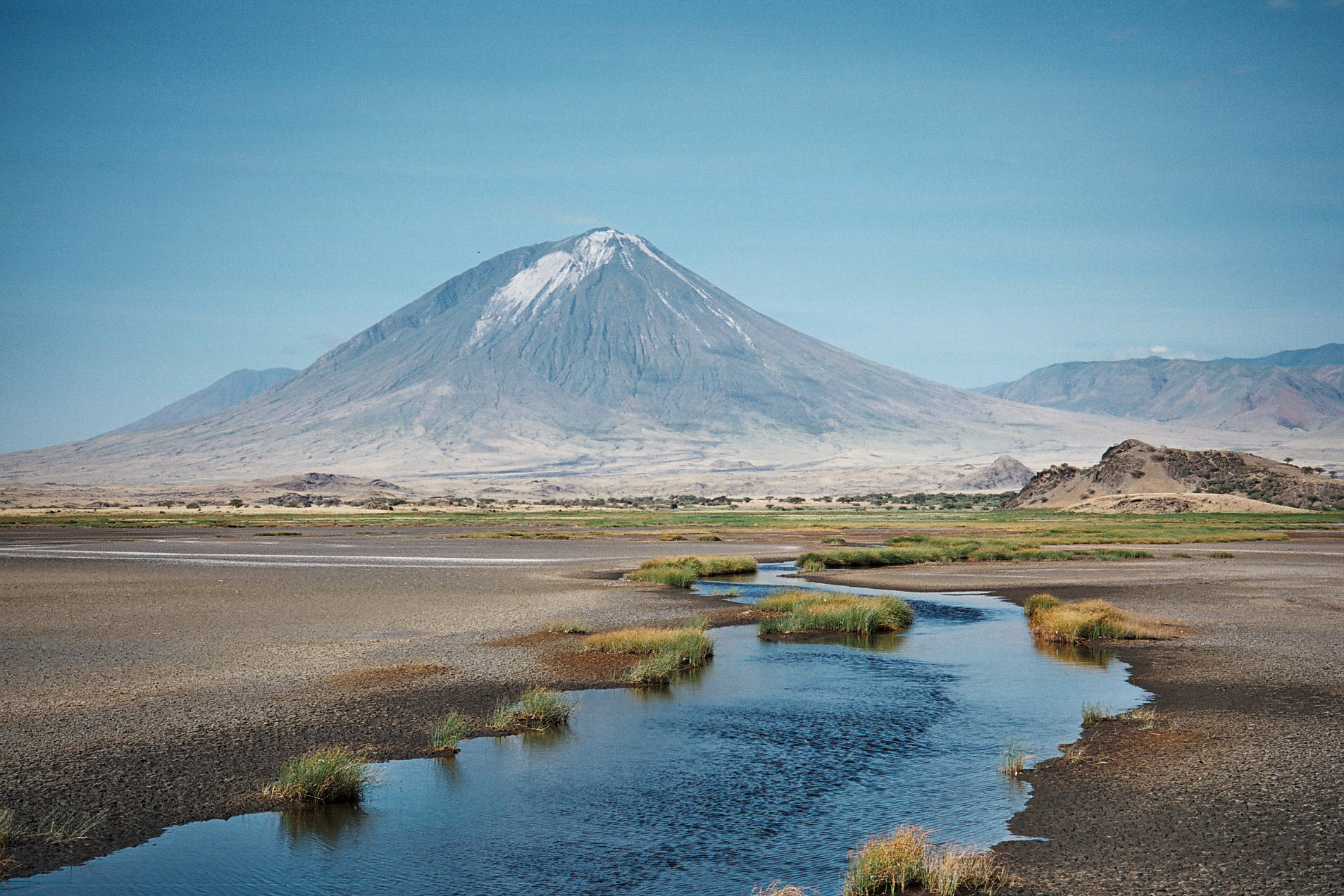
- From top to bottom: Arusha City, Flamingoes of Ngorongoro and Ol Doinyo Lengai from Lake Natron
- Nicknames: Cradle of Humankind; Land of Volcanoes; The Craters Region
- Location in Tanzania
- Coordinates: 3°23′12.84″S 36°40′58.8″E
- Country: Tanzania
- Zone: Northern
- Named for: Arusha people
- Capital: Arusha City
- Districts: List: Arusha District; Arusha City Council; Karatu District; Longido District; Meru District; Monduli District; Ngorongoro District

Government
  - Regional Commissioner: John Mongella

Area
  - Total: 37,576 km^{2} (14,508 sq mi)
  - Land: 33,809 km^{2} (13,054 sq mi)
  - Water: 707 km^{2} (273 sq mi)
  - Rank: 9th of 31
- Highest elevation (Socialist Peak, Mount Meru): 4,562 m (14,967 ft)

Population (2022)
  - Total: 2,356,255
  - Rank: 11th of 31
  - Density: 69.693/km^{2} (180.50/sq mi)
- Demonym: Arushan

Ethnic groups
  - Settler: Swahili
  - Native: Maasai
- Time zone: UTC+3 (EAT)
- Postcode: 23xxx
- Area code: 027
- ISO 3166 code: TZ-01
- HDI (2021): 0.568 medium · 9th of 25
- Website: Official website
- Symbols of Tanzania
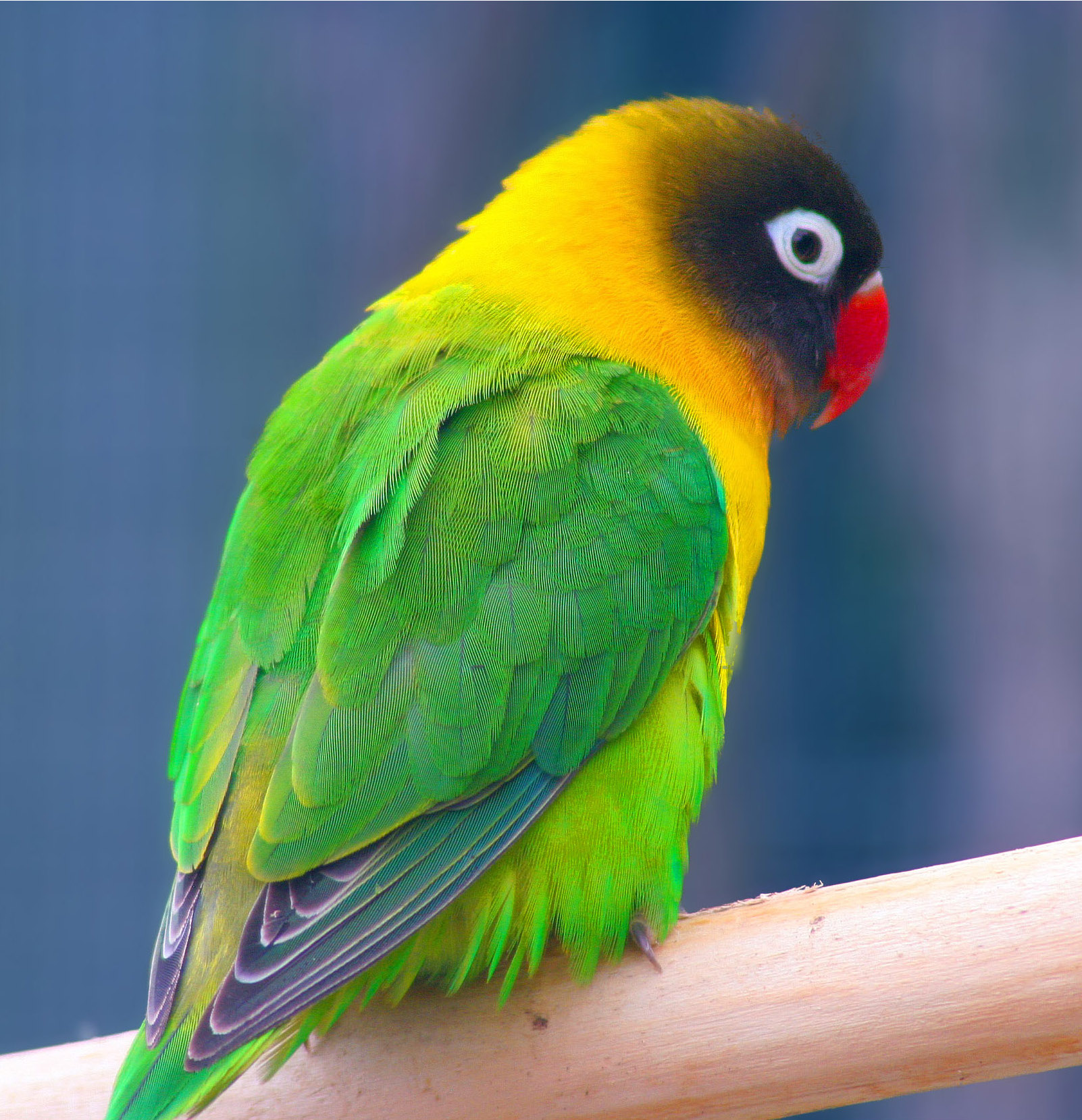
- Bird: Yellow-collard lovebird

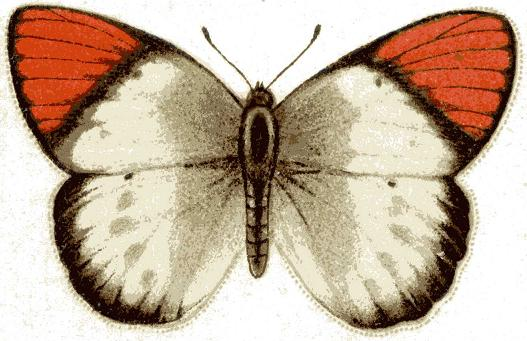
- Butterfly: Colotis danae

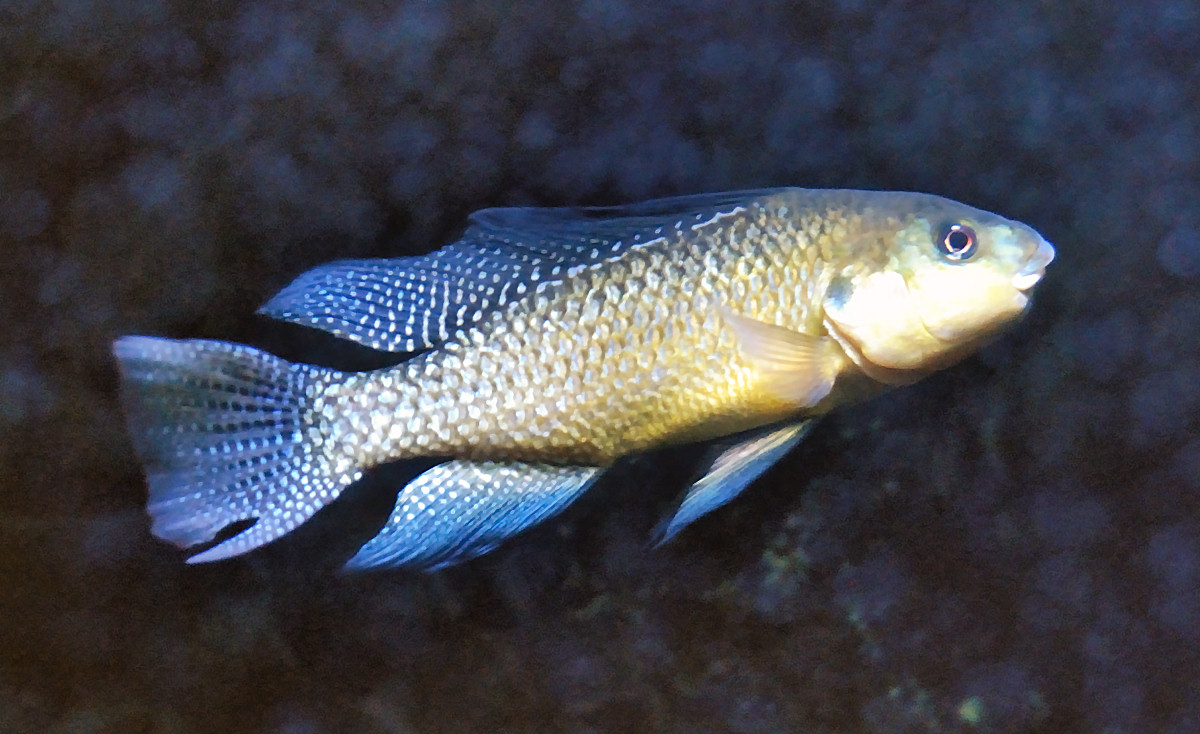
- Fish: Natron tilapia

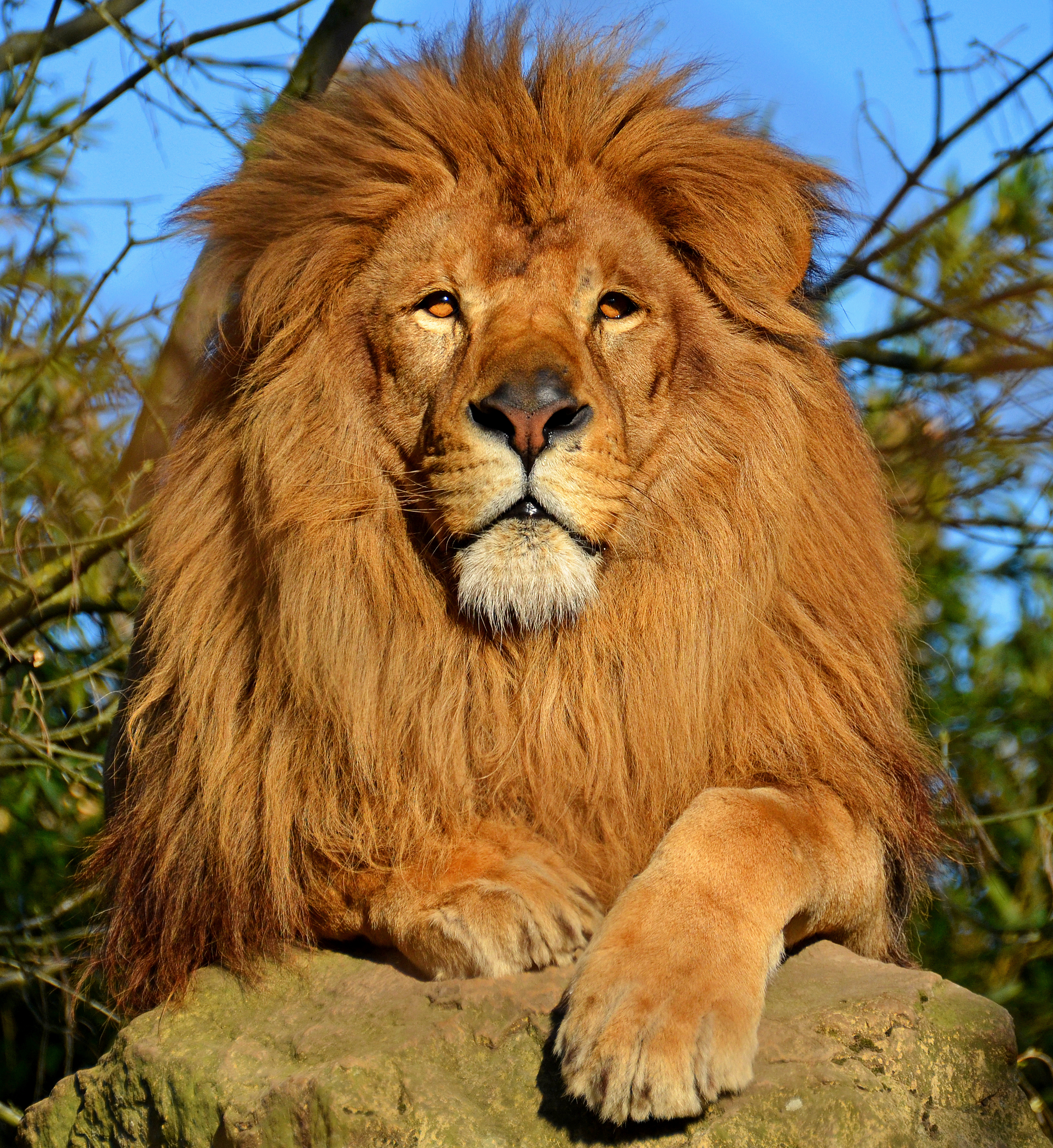
- Mammal: Lion

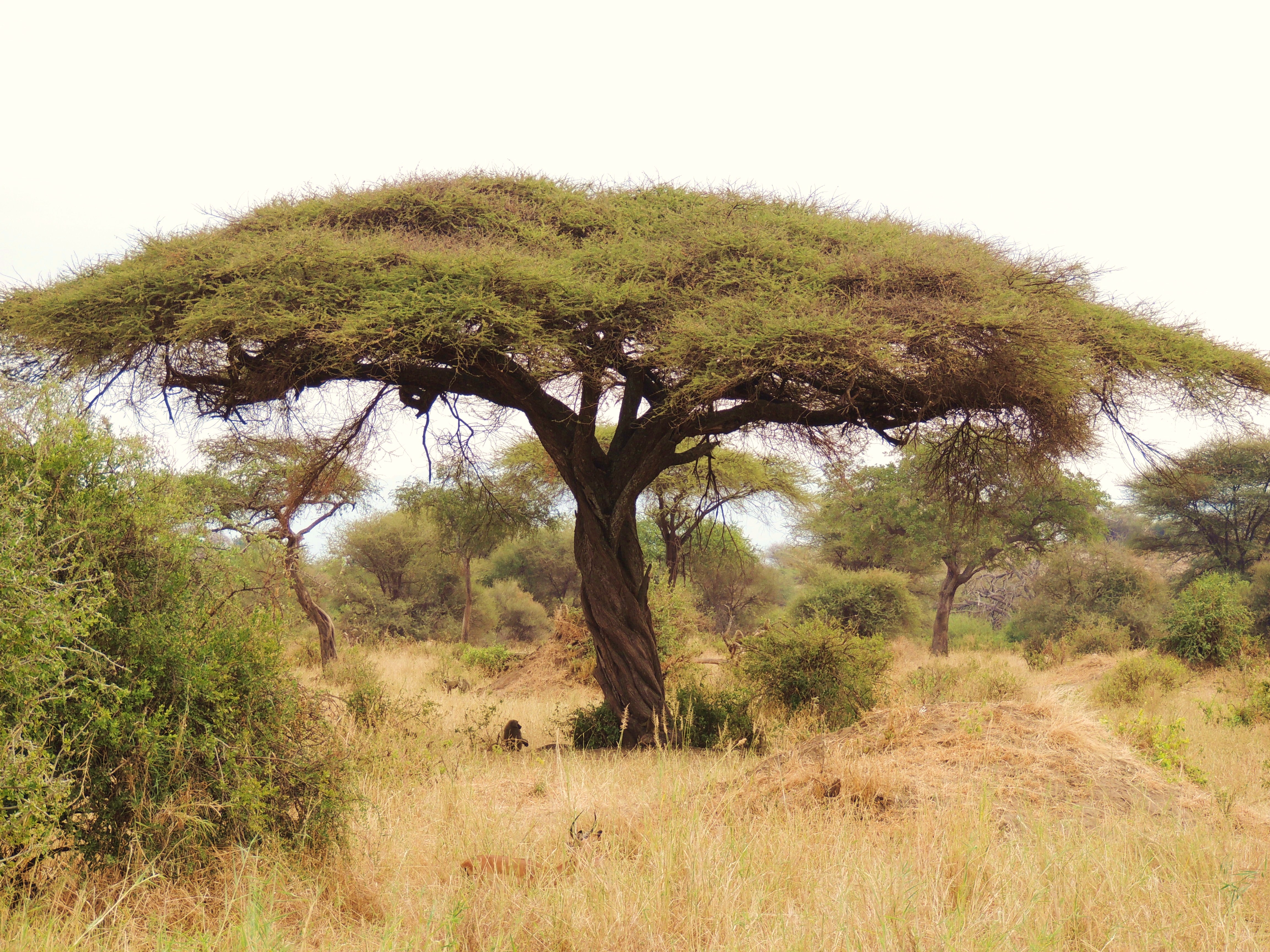
- Tree: Umbrella thorn
- Mineral: Gregoryite

Arusha Region (Swahili: Mkoa wa Arusha) is one of Tanzania's 31 administrative regions and is located in the northeast of the country. The region's capital and largest city is the city of Arusha. The region is bordered by Kajiado County and Narok County in Kenya to the north, the Kilimanjaro Region to the east, the Manyara and Singida Regions to the south, and the Mara and Simiyu regions to the west. Arusha Region is home to Ngorongoro Conservation Area, a UNESCO World Heritage Site. The region is comparable in size to the combined land and water areas of the state of Maryland in the United States.

Arusha Region is a tourist destination in Africa and is the hub of the northern Tanzania safari circuit. The national parks and nature reserves in this region include Ngorongoro Conservation Area, Arusha National Park, the Loliondo Game Controlled Area, and part of Lake Manyara National Park. Remains of 600-year-old stone structures are found at Engaruka, just off the dirt road between Mto wa Mbu and Lake Natron. With a HDI of 0.721, Arusha is among the most developed regions of Tanzania being Tanzania's top 3 most resourceful region.

== Etymology ==
The "Arusha" Region is named after the Arusha people, a Bantu ethnic group that originally migrated from Arusha Chini in Kilimanjaro Region around 400 years ago.

== History ==
=== Prehistory ===
Arusha Region is home to Laetoli and Olduvai Gorge national archaeological sites both locations with discoveries of prehistoric hominids.

=== First Communities ===
The first communities in southwestern Arusha Region's Arusha District, Arusha Rural District and Meru District, were the now extinct Koningo people, an ancient hunter-gatherer group that lived around the slopes of Mount Meru for centuries.

The second community to settle in the region is the Meru People, whom immigrated there from the Usambara Mountains in Tanga Region. They settled on the southeastern slopes of the mountain and started to farm the land. The third wave of settlers were the Arusha people a subgroup of the Pare people migrated from Arusha Chini in Kilimanjaro Region. Some Parakuyo Masai in the west, who were the last group to immigrate to Arusha Region in the 1830s, assimilated into the Arusha community and influenced the Arusha into adopting the Masai language.

In the 1880s a pandemic of rinderpest killed thousands of cattle and forced a large section of the Masai people in the west and integrated into Arusha agriculturally based society. In southeastern portion of the region in Karatu District and southern Ngorongoro District is the ancestral home to the Hadzabe People, who are the only surviving hunter gather communities left in the country.

Moreover, most of the Ngorongoro District, Monduli District and Longido District of the present area of Arusha Region are home to the Maasai, who immigrated from South Sudan, started moving southward around the 16th century CE toward Kenya, and finally reached the northwestern Arusha Region in the 1830s. The Masai were the last precolonial community to settle in the present-day Arusha Region.

=== Colonial period ===
Prior to German arrival in 1895, the years between the 1880s to 1900, Arusha Region was plagued by rinderpest, Smallpox, droughts and famine that came after the devastating plagues.

The first German to visit Arusha territory was Kurt Johannes, and he was antagonistic towards the Arusha people and on occasion he survived an attack that cost the lives of two German missionaries in 1895. On 19 October 1896 he went to visit Chief Matunda and was attacked by Arusha warriors. Johannes survived the attack and returned to his post in Moshi and organised Chagga warriors for a retaliatory attack and defeated the WaArusha on 31 October 1896.

Johannes then decided to conduct the scorched earth doctrine on the WaArusha people, leading to a famine and collapse of Arusha society. In 1899, Johannes forced the defeated Arusha warriors to build the German Boma next to today's Arusha Region Headquarters. The Arusha Region was under German military rule and in 1902, one hundred Afrikaners fleeing the Boer War in South Africa, are resettled in Arusha by German authorities, with each family given 1,000 hectares of land.

For various reasons, many of the white settlers moved to Kenyan highlands or back to South Africa in a few years before the advent of World War I. During the great war, the British capture Arusha Region from the Germans in 1916. They expelled all the Germans and confiscated their farms and redistributed the farms to Greek and British settlers.

The Meru and Arusha's Chagga wives were repatriated back to Kilimanjaro. The British started growing coffee in 1920. The administrative region of Arusha existed in 1922 while mainland Tanzania was a British mandate under the League of Nations and known as Tanganyika. In 1948, the area was in the Northern Province, and shortly afterwards, the British appointed the first WaArusha community leader Chief Simeon Laiseri in 1948.

=== Post-Independence period ===
In 1966, under the newly independent Tanzanian government, Arusha was given its own regional status. In 2002, Manyara Region was created and was split from Arusha Region. Portions of the former Arusha Region districts of Kiteto, Babati, Mbulu, Hanang, and a tiny piece of Monduli were incorporated into the Manyara Region. Arusha was the largest region in Tanzania from 1966 to 2002.

== Geography ==
The Great Rift Valley runs through the middle of the region north-to-south. Oldonyo Lengai (Mountain of God in the Maasai language) is an active volcano to the north of the Ngorongoro Conservation Area. Altitudes throughout the region vary widely, but much of it ranges from 900 to 1,600 metres (3,000 to 5,200 ft) in elevation.

=== Mountains ===
Mount Meru, the second highest mountain in Tanzania after Mount Kilimanjaro, peaks at 4,655 metres (15,272 ft). Arusha Region has the highest number of craters and extinct volcanoes in Tanzania. Other prominent peaks and mountains include the Monduli Mountains, Mount Loolmalasin, Mount Lolkisale, Mount Longido, Gelai Volcano, and the Olduvai Gorge.

=== Lakes ===
Arusha region is home to a number of lakes, the largest lake in the region being Lake Eyasi. Other prominent lakes in the region are Lake Duluti, Momela Lakes, Lake Manyara, Lake Masek, Lake Empakaai, Lake Magadi, Lake Ndutu and Lake Natron. Most of the lakes in the region are alkaline in nature.

== Administrative divisions ==
=== Districts ===
Arusha Region is divided into one city and six districts, each administered by a council.

Districts of Arusha Region
Map	District	Capital	Population (2012)	Area (km^{2})
	Arusha City	Arusha	416,442	93
	Arusha Rural District^{*}	Sokon II	323,198	1,547.6
	Karatu District	Karatu Town	230,166	3,300
	Longido District	Longido	123,153	7,782
	Meru District^{**}	Usa River	268,144	1,268.2
	Monduli District	Monduli	158,929	6,419
	Ngorongoro District	Loliondo	174,278	14,036
	Total	Arusha	1,694,310	34,526

Notes:

^{*} - representing the west portion of the former Arumeru District
^{**} - representing the east portion of the former Arumeru District

== National parks, national monuments, and other sites ==
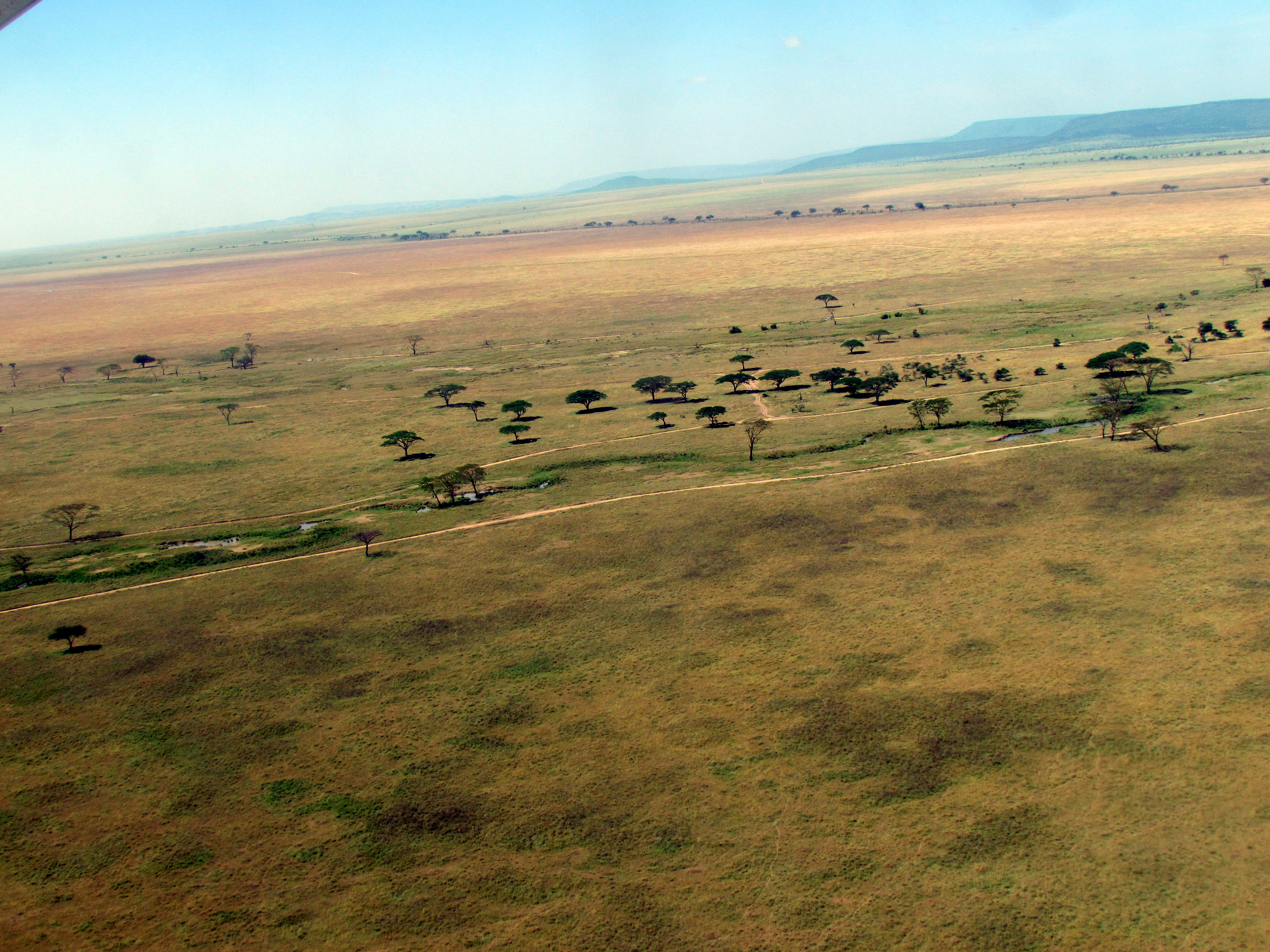
Western Arusha Region, Tanzania.

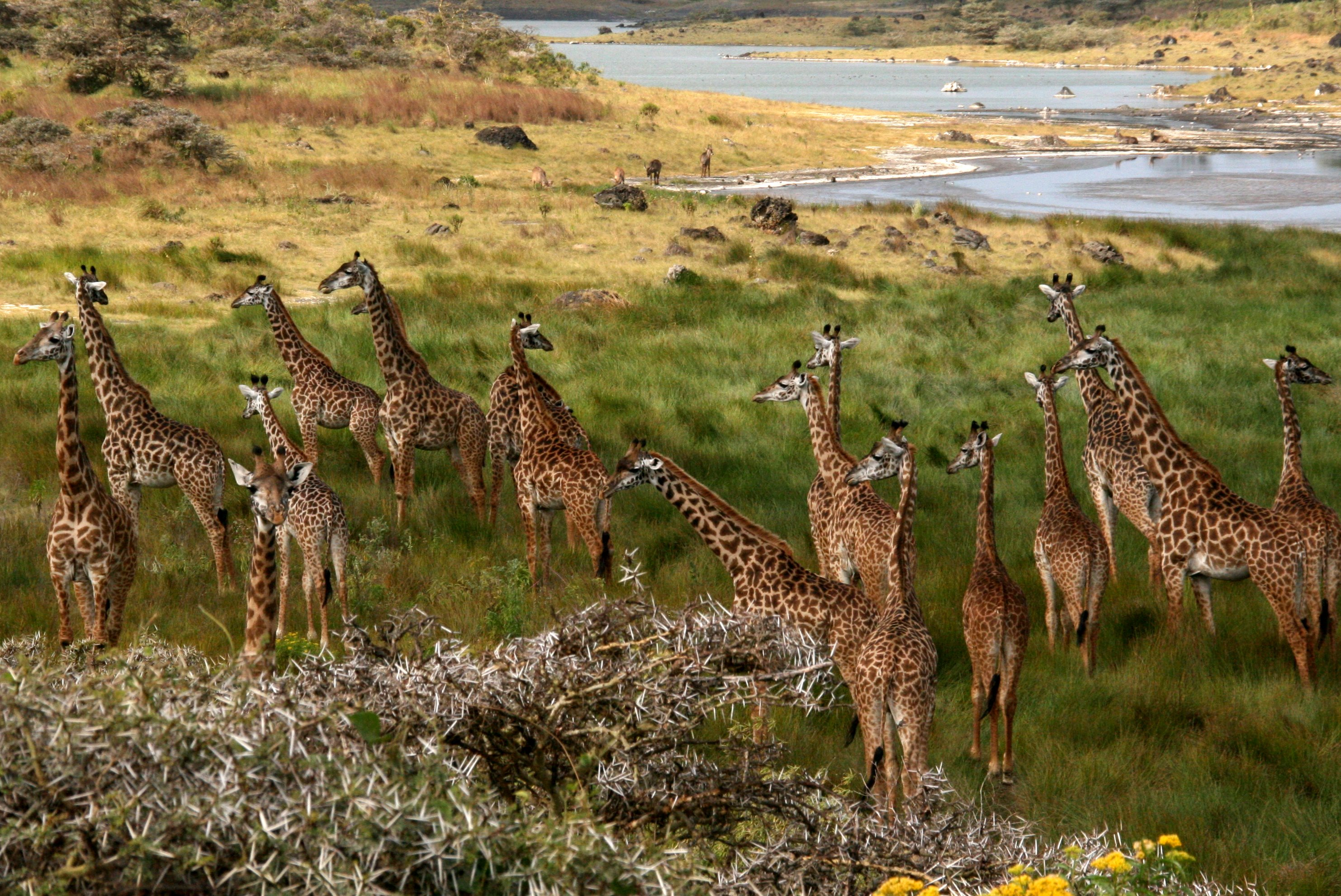
Giraffes Arusha National Park, Arusha Region, Tanzania.

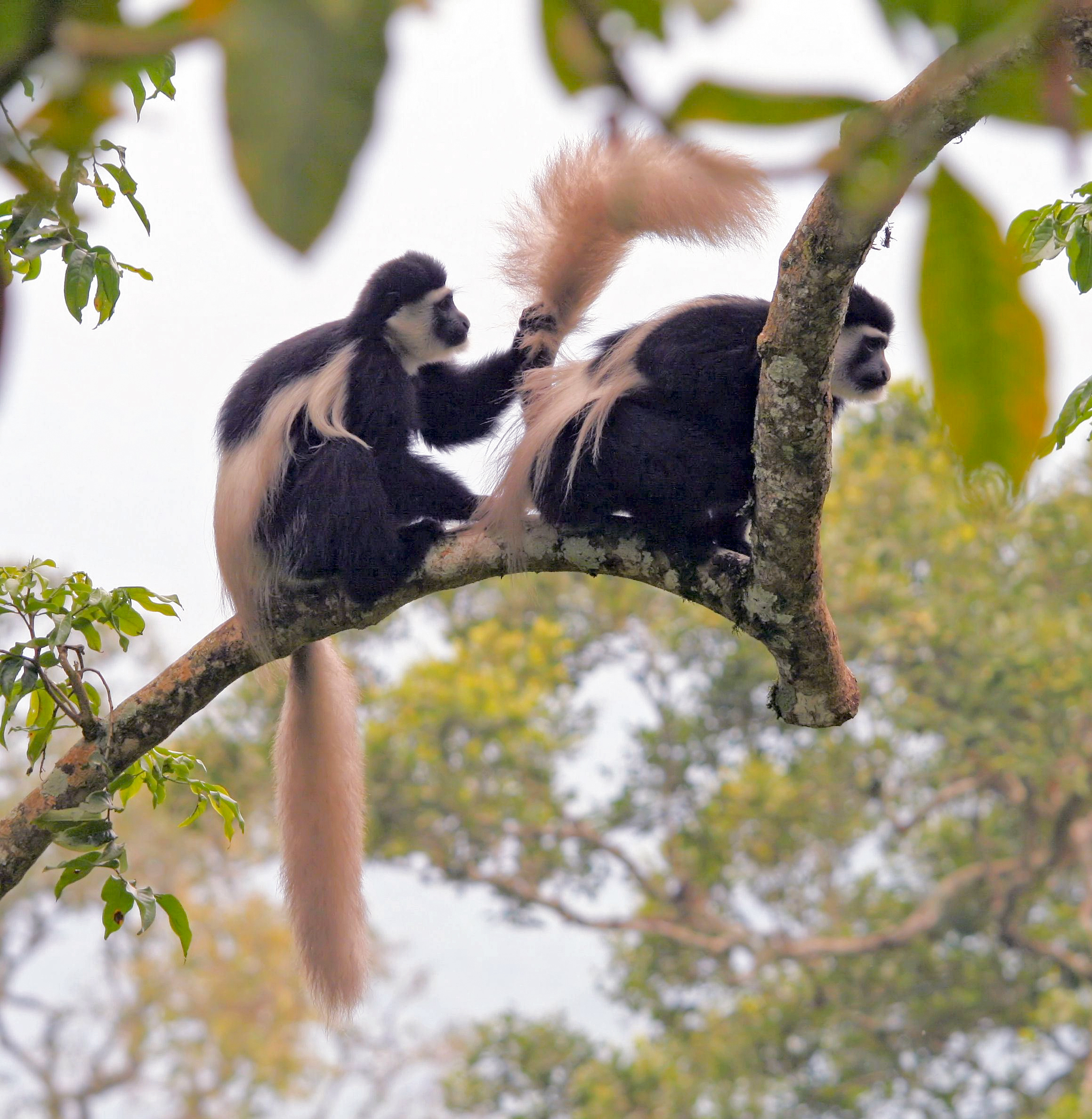
Colobus guereza Mantelaffen at Arusha National Park, Arusha Region.

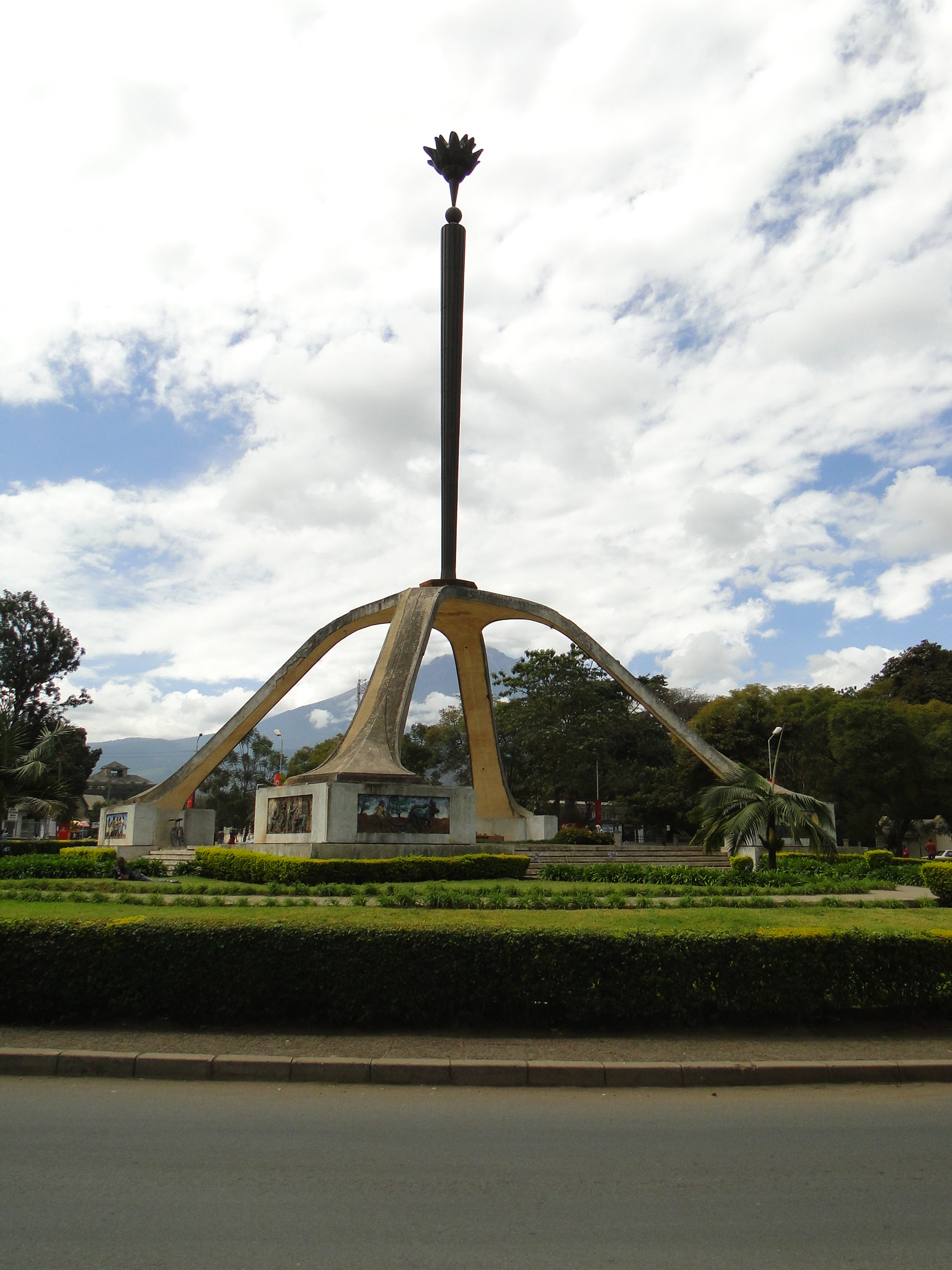
Arusha Declaration Monument

1. Arusha National Park
2. Empakaai Crater
3. Engaruka
4. Great Rift Valley
5. Lake Manyara National Park (part)
6. Mount Longido Forest Reserve
7. Mount Meru Forest Reserve
8. Ngorongoro Conservation Area
9. Ngurdoto Crater
10. Oldonyo Lengai
11. Olduvai Gorge
12. Uhuru Monument

== Demographics ==
According to the 2012 national census, the Arusha Region had a population of 1,694,310.

The region is inhabited by various ethnolinguistic groups and communities. Among these are the Iraqw, Arusha, Maasai, Wameru, Sonjo, Chagga, Pare, and Nguu.

== Culture and cuisine ==
Nyama Choma, the northern Tanzanian barbecue, is a popular dish among some communities in the Arusha Region, particularly the Maasai.

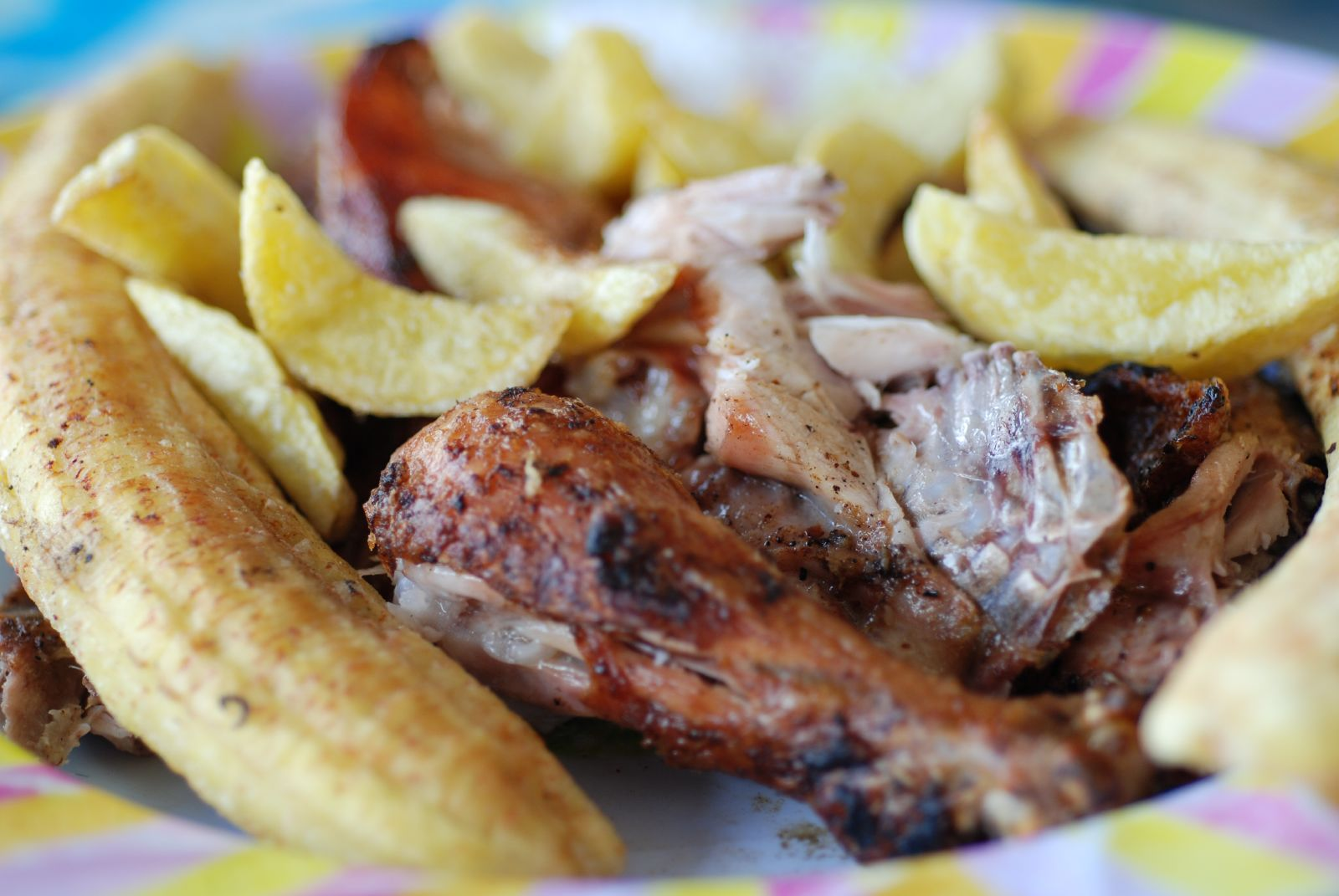
Arusha cuisine

== Transportation ==
=== Roads ===
The A-23 Arusha-Himo road runs east–west and enters the region near Kilimanjaro International Airport. It connects Arusha with Moshi and then Himo at the Kenyan border. This roads ends at its junction with the A-104 road in the center of Arusha.

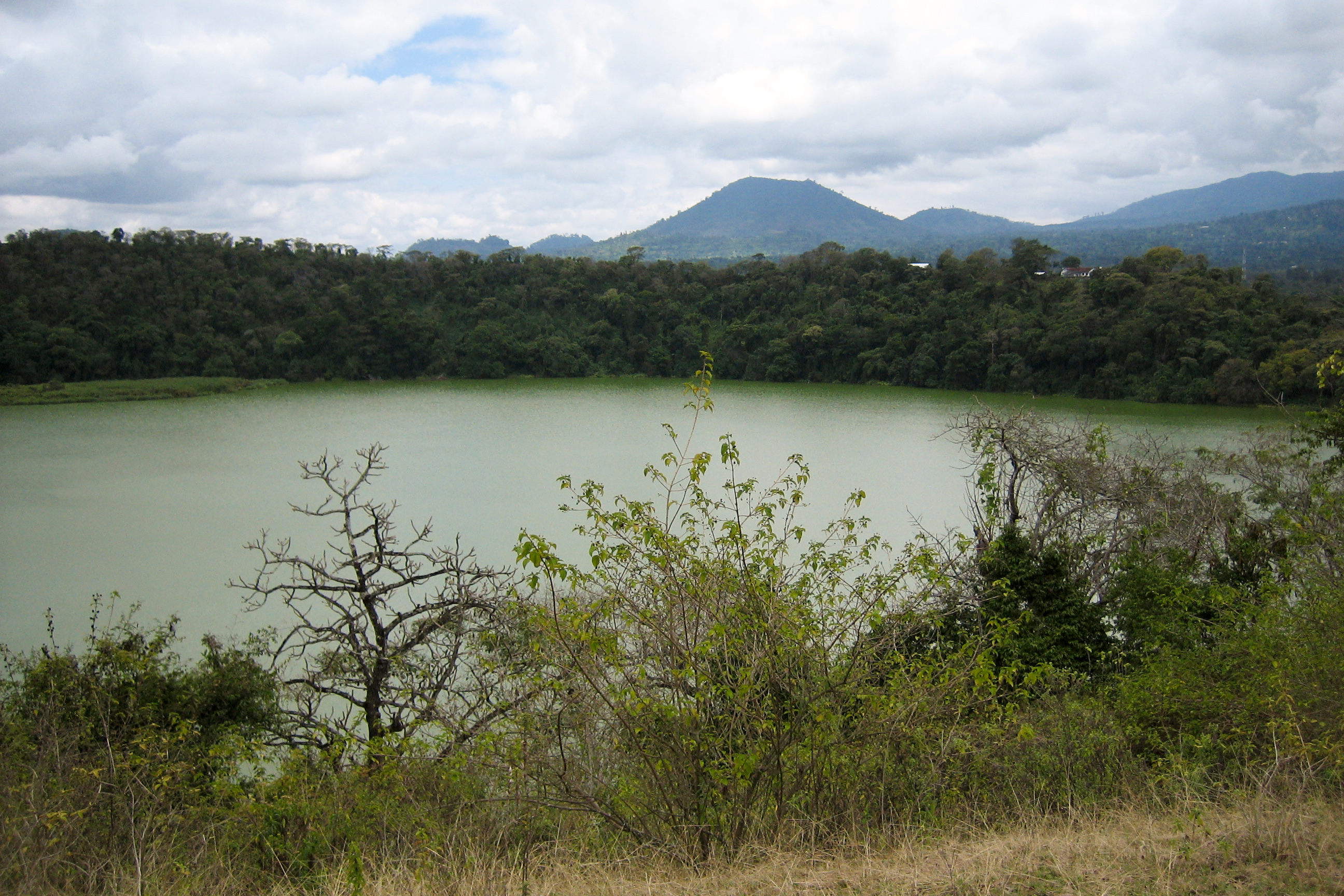
Lake Duluti

The A-104 runs northward, to the west of Mount Meru, from Arusha to Longido and Namanga at the Kenyan border before continuing to Nairobi. The A-104 also runs westward past Monduli to its junction at Makuyuni with the B-144 road that leads to Mto wa Mbu and the Ngorongoro Conservation Area. After that, the A-104 curves southward to the east of Lake Manyara and continues on to Babati and Dodoma.

Most overland travel is done by bus from the city of Arusha. Within the city and smaller towns, privately owned and operated dala-dalas (mini-buses) are used.

The region is landlocked, and there are no navigable rivers. The larger lakes in the Rift Valley are not used for transportation. The region is home to Lake Eyasi, Lake Natron, Lake Duluti, Lake Empakaai, and the Momella lakes.

=== Airports ===
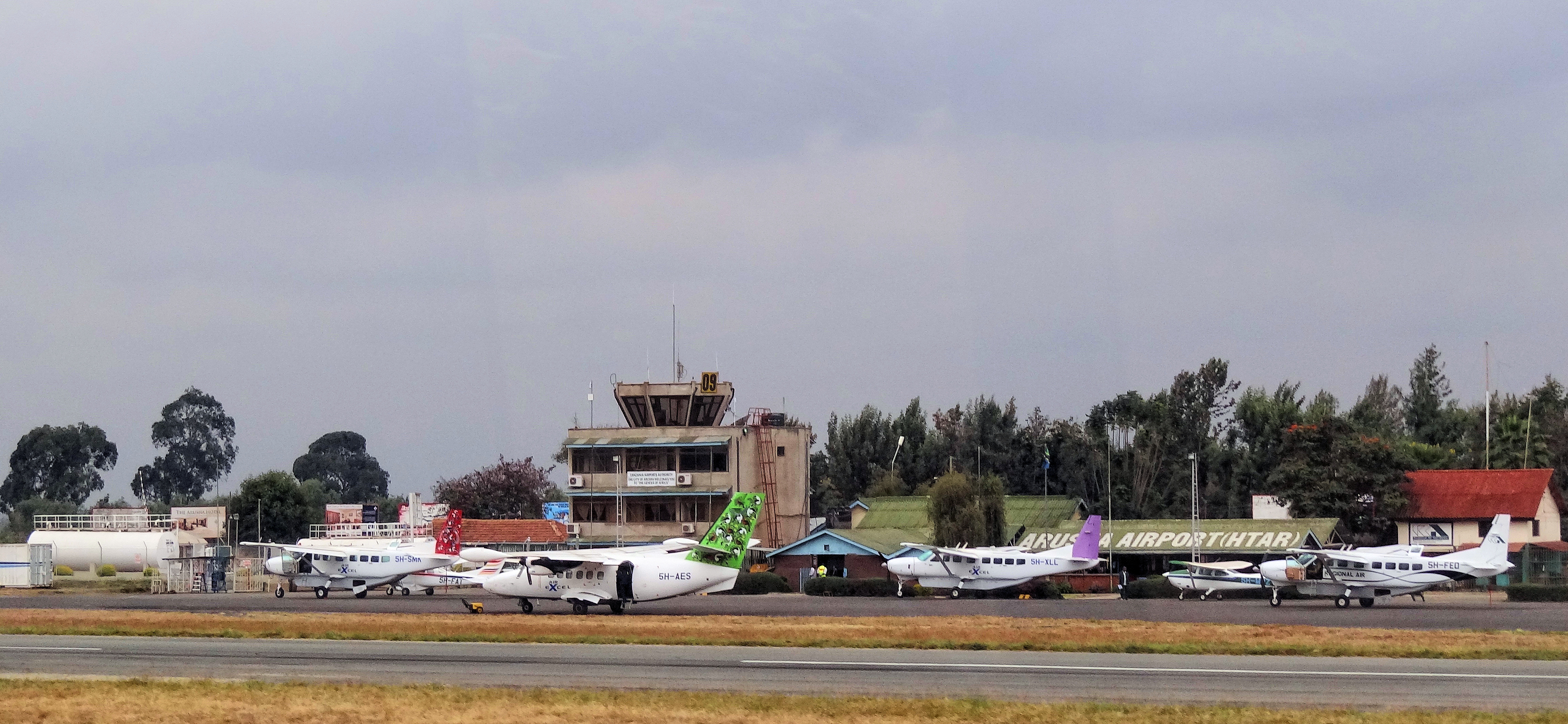
Arusha Airport circa 2012.

Arusha Region is served by the Kilimanjaro International Airport located in Hai District of Kilimanjaro Region. Its twelve international carriers are:

1. Airkenya Express
2. Air Uganda
3. Condor
4. Edelweiss Air
5. Ethiopian Airlines
6. Kenya Airways
7. KLM
8. Precision Air
9. Qatar Airways
10. RwandAir
11. Safarilink Aviation
12. Turkish Airlines

The smaller Arusha Airport (Kisongo Airport) serves small, medium and personal planes mainly to popular tourist areas such as Serengeti National Park, Seronera, Ndutu, Zanzibar etc. Planes using Kisongo Airport include:

1. AMREF
2. Auric Air
3. Coastal Air
4. Flying Doctors
5. Grumeti Air
6. Other personal planes.
7. Precision Air
8. TFC

== Notable persons from Arusha Region ==
- Mrisho Sarakikya, The first Chief of the Tanzanian Defence Force.
- Mark Behr, writer
- Filbert Bayi Tanzanian long distance runner
- Dogo Janja, Tanzanian recording artist
- Edward Lowassa Tanzania's tenth prime minister from 2005 to 2008
- Vanessa Mdee, Tanzanian recording artist
- Peter K. Palangyo, Tanzanian novelist and diplomat
- Edward Sokoine Tanzania's second prime minister
- [WEUSI) A Group of hip hop music from Arusha
- [Flamebmc]Tanzanian musician
- Harold O'Neal Film maker and composer
- Abdulrahman Omari Kinana, politician
- Nancy Sumari, writer and former model
- Nakaaya Sumari, musician

== Regional commissioners ==
The chief administrative officer of the region is the regional commissioner. Below is a table showing the regional commissioners serving the Arusha Region from 1962 to present:

Name of Regional Commissioner	From	To	Comments
Dorcus Maduma	1962	1962	first after independence
Peter Walwa	1962	1963	
Samuel Chamshama	1963	1964	first after union with Zanzibar
John Mhaville	1964	1964	second term
Wazir Juma	1964	1968	
Aaron Mwakangata	1968	1973	
Abdulanur Suleiman	1973	1978	
Peter Siyovelwa	1978	1981	
John Mhaville	1981	1982	
Charles Kileo	1983	1985	
Christopher Liundi	1985	1987	
Augustine Mwingira	1987	1990	
Anatoly Tarimo	1990	1992	
Ahmed Kiwanuka	1992	1995	
Daniel Ole Njoolay	1995	2003	longest serving commissioner
Mohammed Babu	2003	2006	
Abbas Kandoro	2006	2006	less than six months
Samuel Ndomba	2006	2007	
Isidore Leka Shirima	2007	2011	
Magesa Stanslaus Mulongo	2011	2014	
Lilian Steven Okama	2014	2016	
Mrisho Gambo	2016	2020	
Idd Hassan Kimanta	2020		

== See also ==
- Arusha Accords
- Arusha Airport
- Arusha Cultural Heritage Centre
- Arusha Declaration
- Geography of Tanzania
- Mguu wa Zuberi
- Selian River
