= Selian =

Selian may refer to:

- Selian River, a river in Tanzania
- Selian language, Baltic language spoken by the Eastern Baltic tribe of the Selonians
