= Arusha =

City in Arusha Region, Tanzania

Arusha Jiji la Arusha (Swahili)
- City
- Halmashauri ya Jiji la Arusha
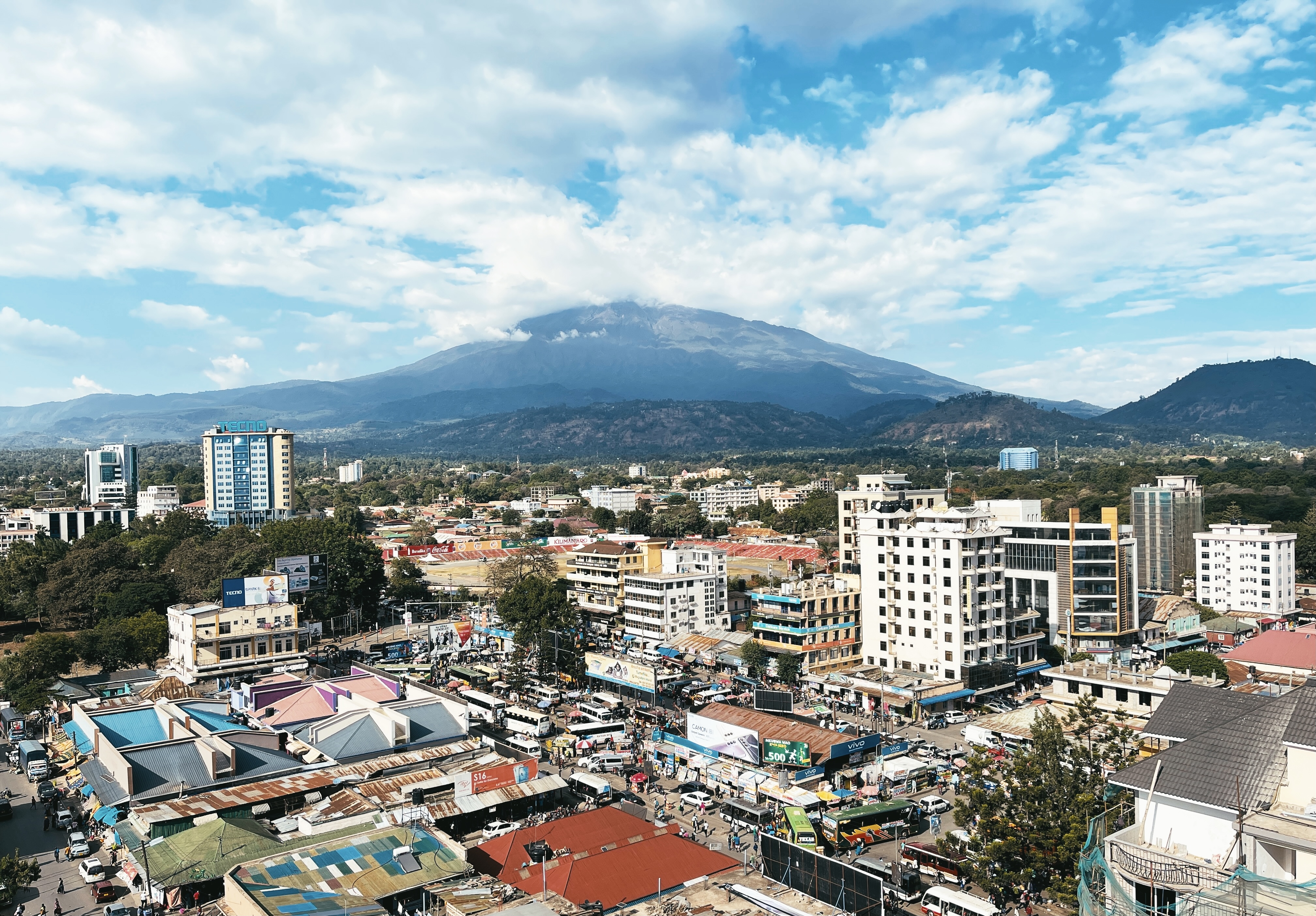
- Arusha City in 2021

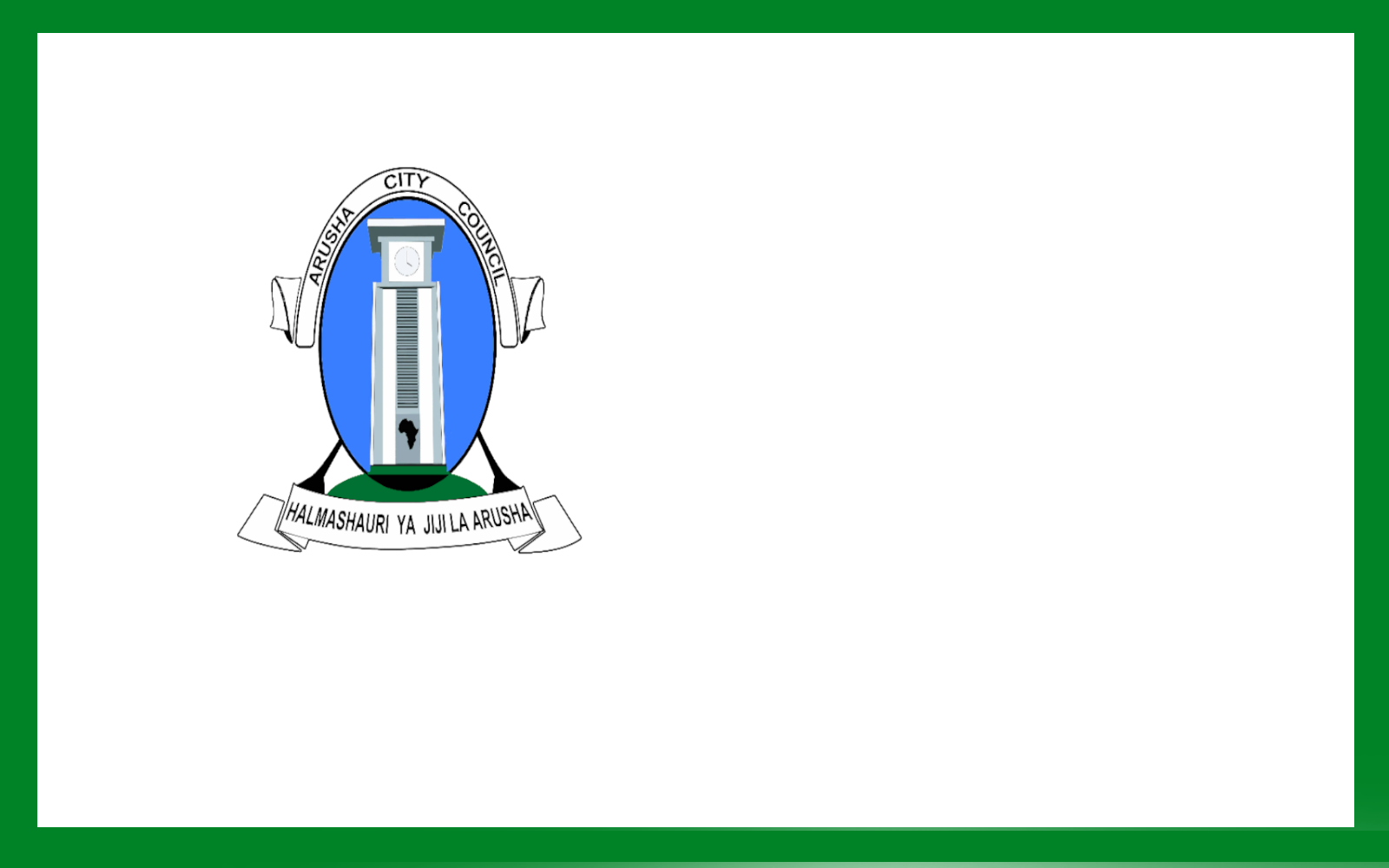
- Flag
- Nicknames: Arachuga, Geneva of Africa, "City of Agreements"
- Motto: Jiji la Makubaliano
- Location of Arusha City
- Coordinates: 03°22′S 36°41′E
- Country: United Republic of Tanzania
- Region: Arusha Region
- City: Arusha City Council
- Incorporated town: 1948
- Incorporated city: July 2010

Government
  - Type: City council
  - Mayor: Hon. Maxmillian Matle Iranqhe
- Elevation: 1,400 m (4,600 ft)

Population (2022 census)
  - Total: 617,631
  - Density: 93/km^{2} (240/sq mi)
- Time zone: UTC+3 (EAT)
  - Summer (DST): UTC+3 (not observed)
- Area code: 027
- Climate: Cwb
- Website: City website

Arusha is a city in Tanzania. The city is the capital of the Arusha Region. It has a population of 617,631 people.

Located below Mount Meru on the eastern edge of the eastern branch of the Great Rift Valley, Arusha region has a temperate climate. The region is close to the Serengeti National Park, the Ngorongoro Conservation Area, Lake Manyara National Park, Olduvai Gorge, Tarangire National Park, Mount Kilimanjaro, and Mount Meru in the Arusha National Park.

The region is a major international diplomatic hub. It hosts the African Court of the African Union and is the capital of the East African Community. From 1994 to 2015, the region also hosted the International Criminal Tribunal for Rwanda, but that entity has ceased operations. Currently, it hosts one of the branches of the United Nations International Residual Mechanism for Criminal Tribunals.

Arusha is a multicultural region with a majority Tanzanian population of mixed backgrounds: indigenous African, Arab-Tanzanian and Indian-Tanzanian population, plus a small European and North American minority population. Religions of the Arusha region population include Christianity, Islam, Sikhism and Hinduism.

== History ==
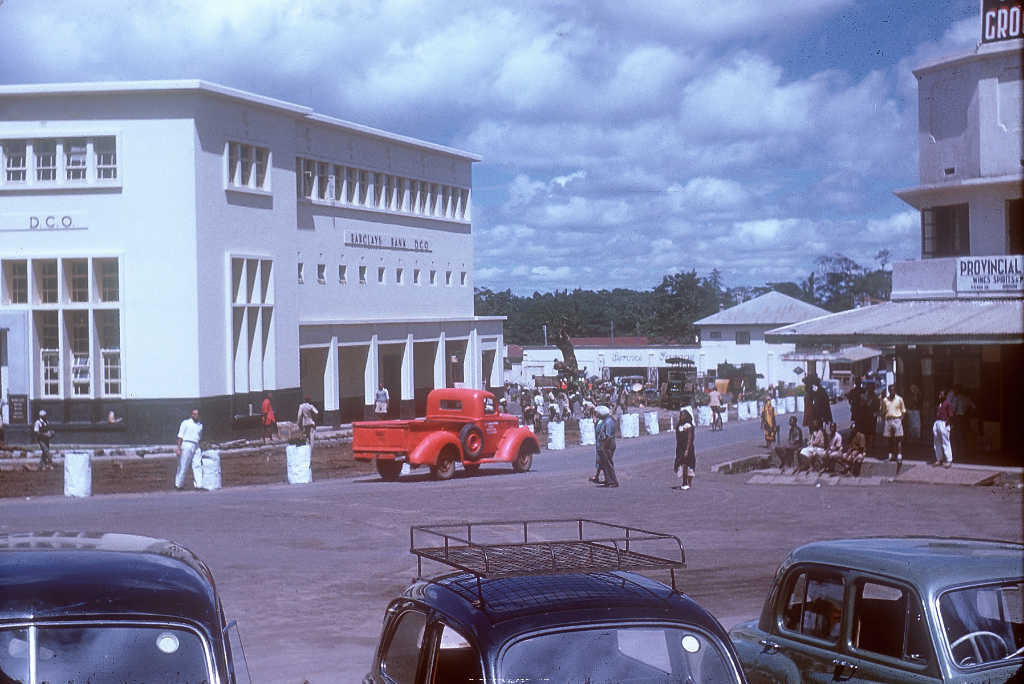
Arusha clock tower area, 1953.

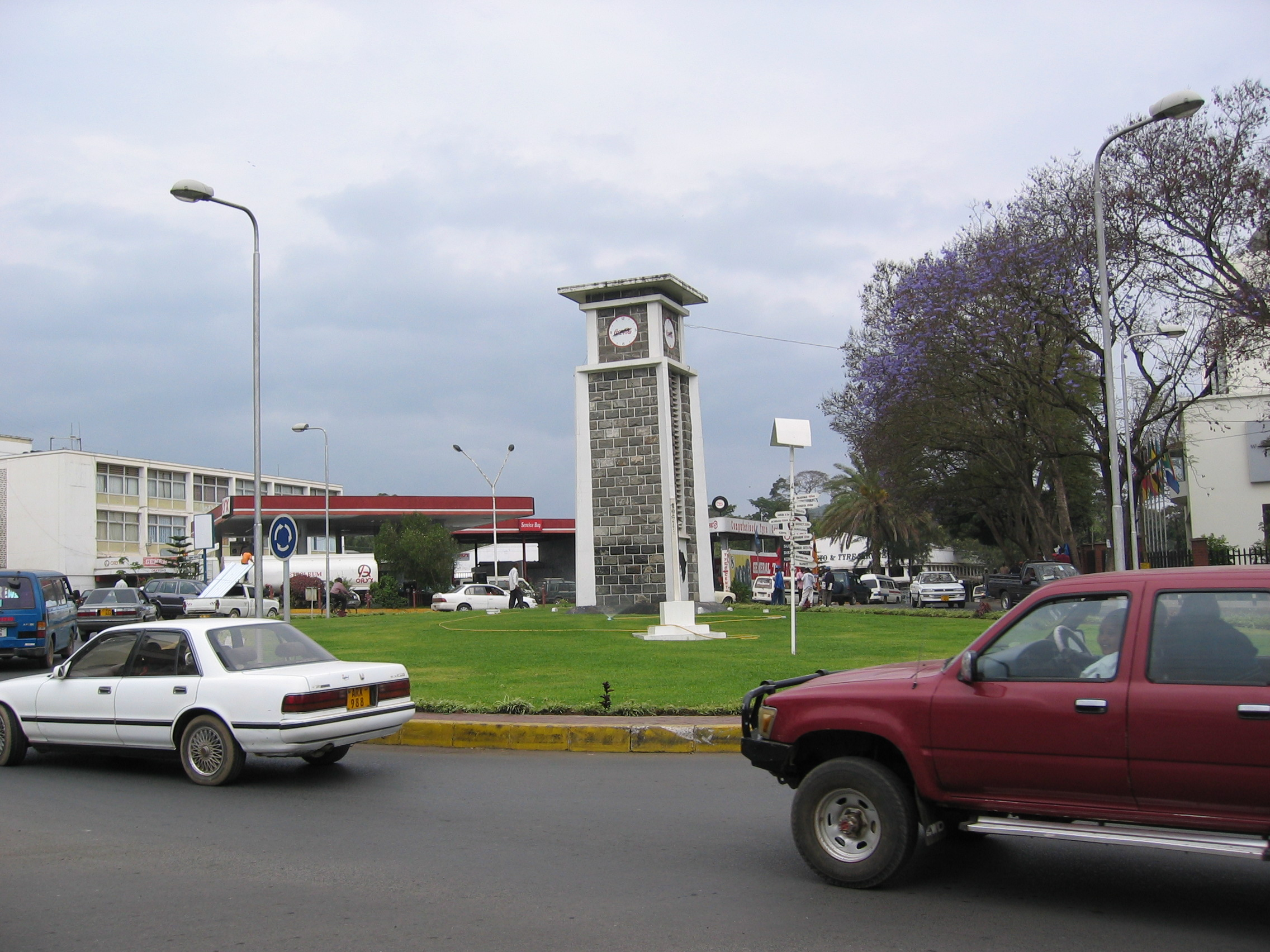
The Arusha clock tower in the Central Business Area of Arusha City, 2005.

The current site of Arusha was first settled in the 1830s by the agro-pastoral Arusha Maasai from the Arusha Chini community, south of Mount Kilimanjaro. They traded grains, honey, beer, and tobacco with the pastoral Kisongo Maasai in exchange for livestock, milk, meat, and skins. Demand for Arusha's foodstuffs increased substantially during the 1860s when the Pangani Valley trade route was extended through Old Moshi, Arusha, and ultimately to western Kenya. Although not yet a town, it was a regional centre with a number of urban features.

Arusha was conquered by the Germans in 1896 after the murder of the first two missionaries who attempted to settle on nearby Mount Meru. The Germans established a permanent presence in 1900 when a military fort (a boma) was built and soldiers were garrisoned there. "The boma was a solid statement, meant to impress German moral and political order on the surrounding countryside. Set on a rise overlooking the plains, the fortress-like building dominated the surrounding landscape" complete with a machine gun.

Many Africans were forcibly displaced from their ancestral lands by the Germans and forced to dig lime or carry stones to construct the fort. The British took Arusha from the Germans in 1916 during World War I. German officials left the area, the British deported German missionaries and settlers, and only a skeletal military administration of the town remained.

During the 1920s, civilian administration was implemented, missionaries from the United States arrived, British and Greek settlers reoccupied the former German farms, and the town grew, especially after the British moved the regional administration from New Moshi to Arusha. The extension of the railroad from Moshi to Arusha in 1928-29 greatly increased commerce. The Great Depression soon squelched commerce and Arusha in 1940 had fewer than 2,000 residents. Growth resumed during World War II and by 1948, the population had increased to more than 5,000.

In 1952, a partial census was conducted in Tanganyika, covering cities and towns. Arusha's population at the time was 7,797, of whom 1,084 were Europeans, 3,153 were Asians, and 3,560 native Africans.

By the 1950s, Arusha was "a polyglot, westernized little town; it has a Greek community, several Germans predating World War I, and some German Jewish refugees post-dating World War II." A state of emergency was declared in the Arusha region in 1953 in response to the Mau Mau Uprising. Journalist John Gunther noted at the time that "a loyal tribe, the Waarusha, threatened to take violent countermeasures against the Kikuyus themselves, if the British did not. The authorities arrested the leading Mau Mau conspirators, screened thousands more, and deported other thousands back to Kenya."

In the 1960s, parts of the movie Hatari! with John Wayne were filmed at Momela Lakes and at Mount Meru.

Arusha has been a crucial city in the history of modern Tanzania. Official documents ceding independence to Tanganyika were signed by the United Kingdom at Arusha in 1961. The Arusha Declaration was signed in 1967 in Arusha. The Arusha Accords were signed at the city of Arusha on 4 August 1993, by representatives of competing factions in the Rwandan civil war.

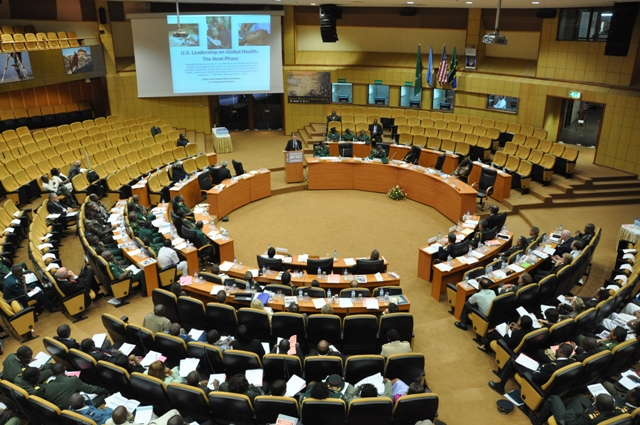
East African Legislative Assembly.

The Arusha Peace and Reconciliation Agreement for Burundi was signed on 28 August 2000 as part of a process forging peace in that country through power sharing and establishing a transitional government.

The January 2015 Arusha Agreement for South Sudan created a framework for the reunification of South Sudan's ruling SPLM party, which had splintered into three creating a humanitarian crisis as fighting between factions intensified. It provided that all SPLM members who were dismissed be reinstated to their previous positions and a secret ballot system be adopted.

In 1994, the UN Security Council decided by its Resolution 955 of 8 November 1994 that Arusha should host the ad hoc International Criminal Tribunal for Rwanda. The establishment of the tribunal with its foreign employees has influenced the local economy of the city increasing the cost of living for residents. The tribunal has downsized due to its closure in 2014, but its legal successor, the United Nations International Residual Mechanism for Criminal Tribunals established by United Nations Security Council Resolution 1966, will continue entertaining a branch in Arusha, opening on 1 July 2012. The tribunal indicted 93 individuals and sentenced 62.

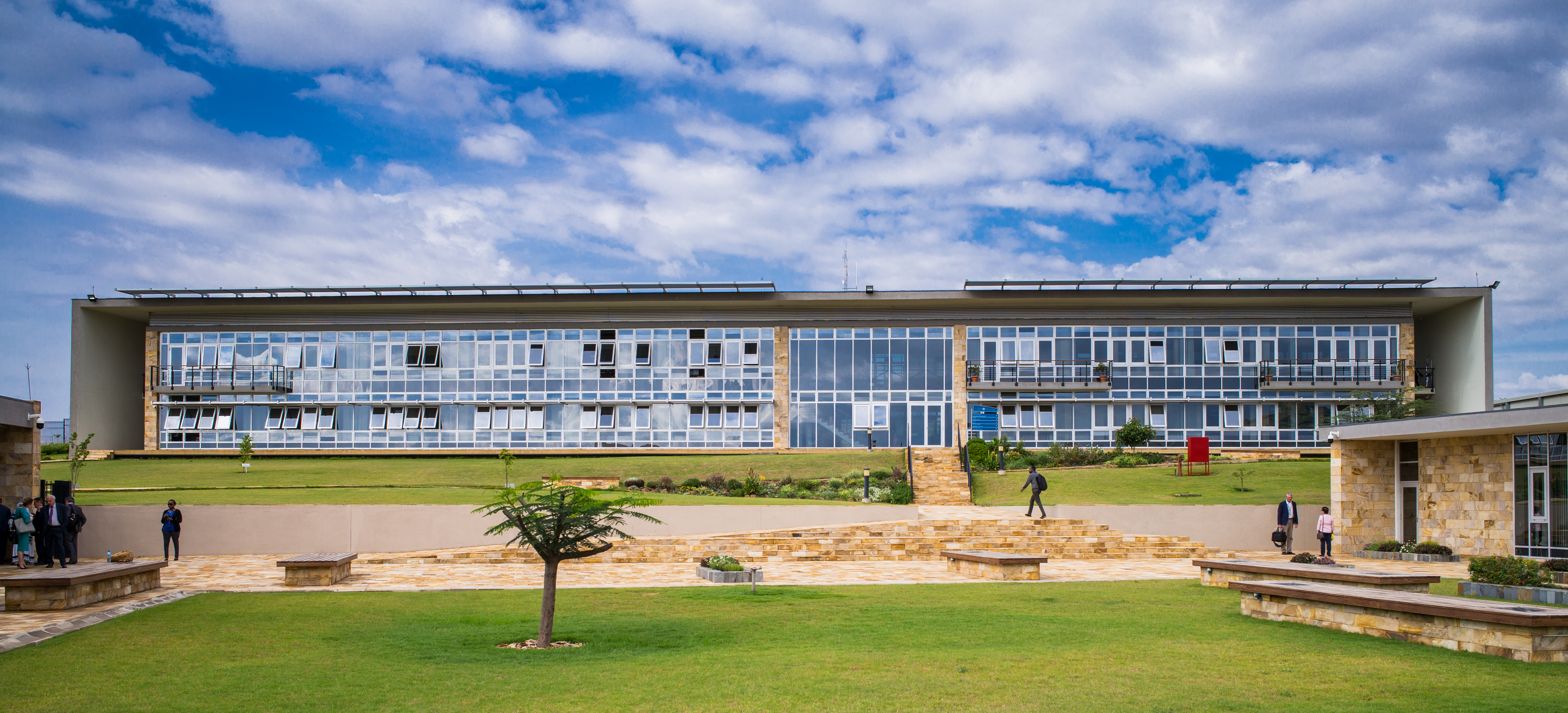
TUN International Residual Mechanism for Criminal Tribunals, Arusha.

The Tanzanian government intended to declare Arusha a city on 1 July 2006, but this was delayed due to pending municipality boundary adjustments. Arusha was granted city status on 15 August 2012, with it becoming official on 2 November 2012.

In 2013, a quarry located in Arusha collapsed and killed 14 miners after heavy rain.

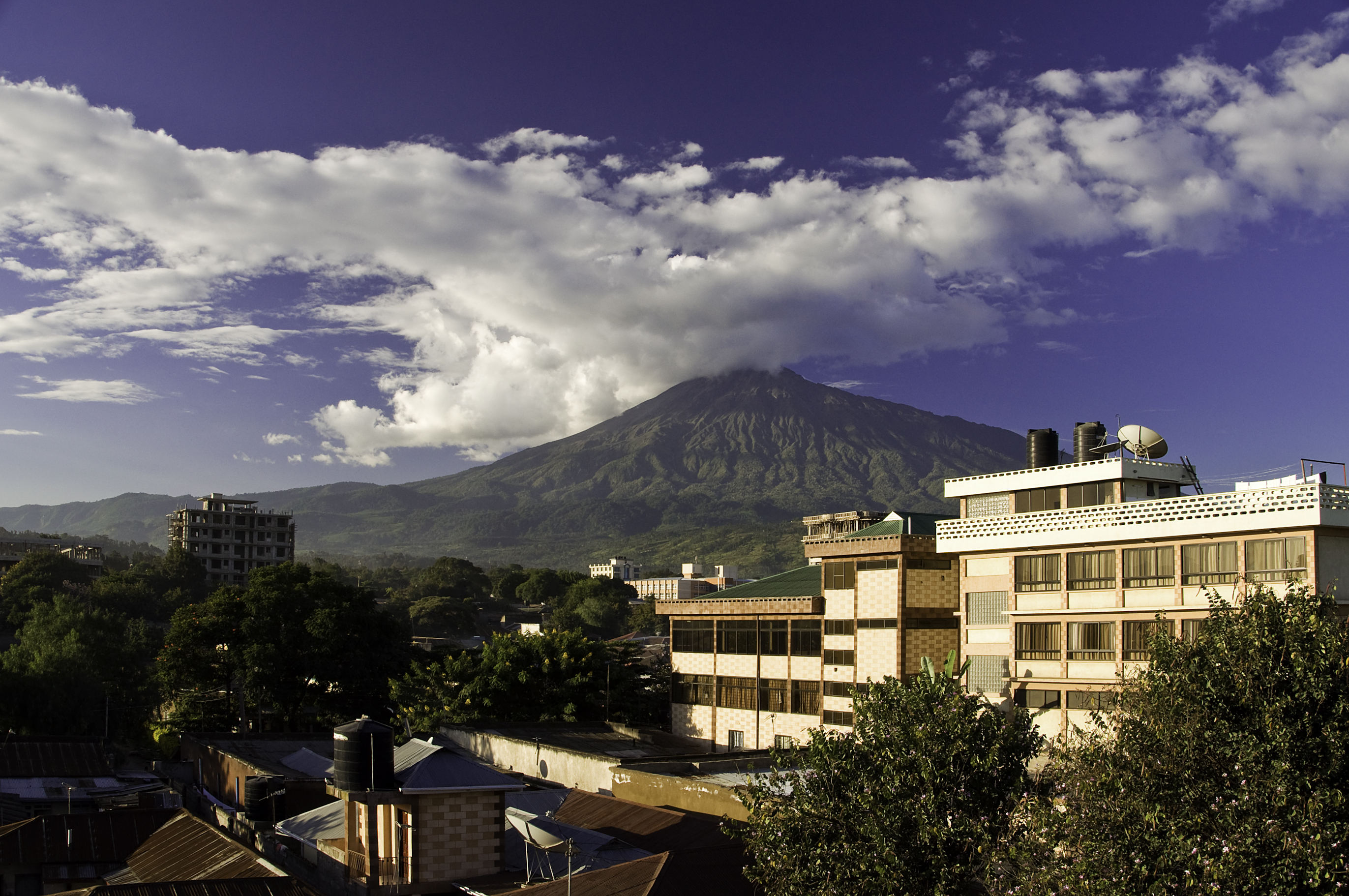
Mount Meru in the background of the city of Arusha.

Historical population
Year	Pop.	±%
1952	7,797	—
1978	55,223	+608.3%
1988	102,544	+85.7%
2002	333,791	+225.5%
2012	416,442	+24.8%
2022	617,631	+48.3%

== Intergovernmental organisations ==
Arusha is home to a number of notable intergovernmental organisations. The city of Arusha is the headquarters of the East African Community, hosts a branch of the International Residual Mechanism for Criminal Tribunals, and the African Court on Human and Peoples' Rights.

== Transport ==
=== Airport ===
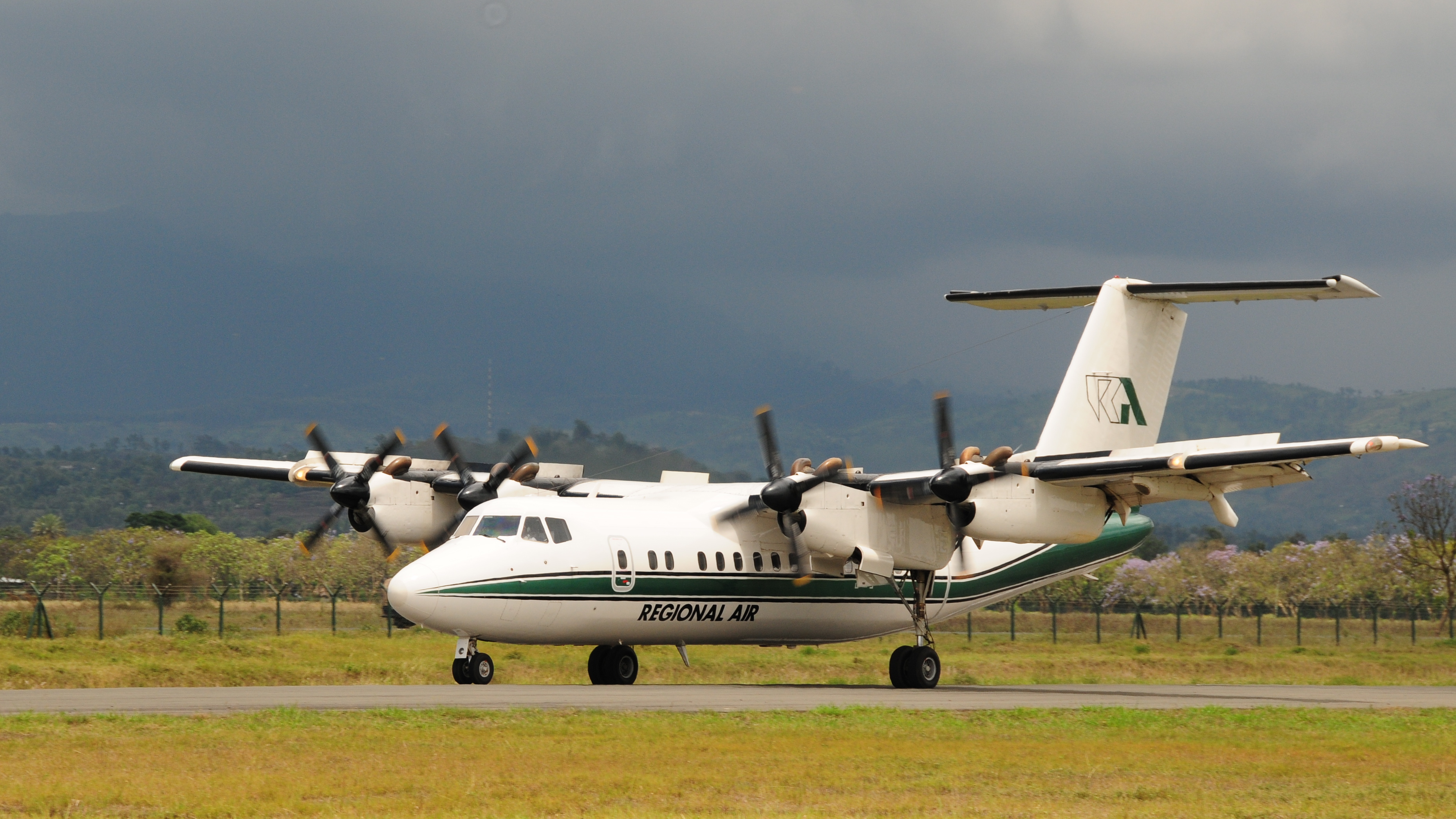
Aircraft at Arusha Airport.

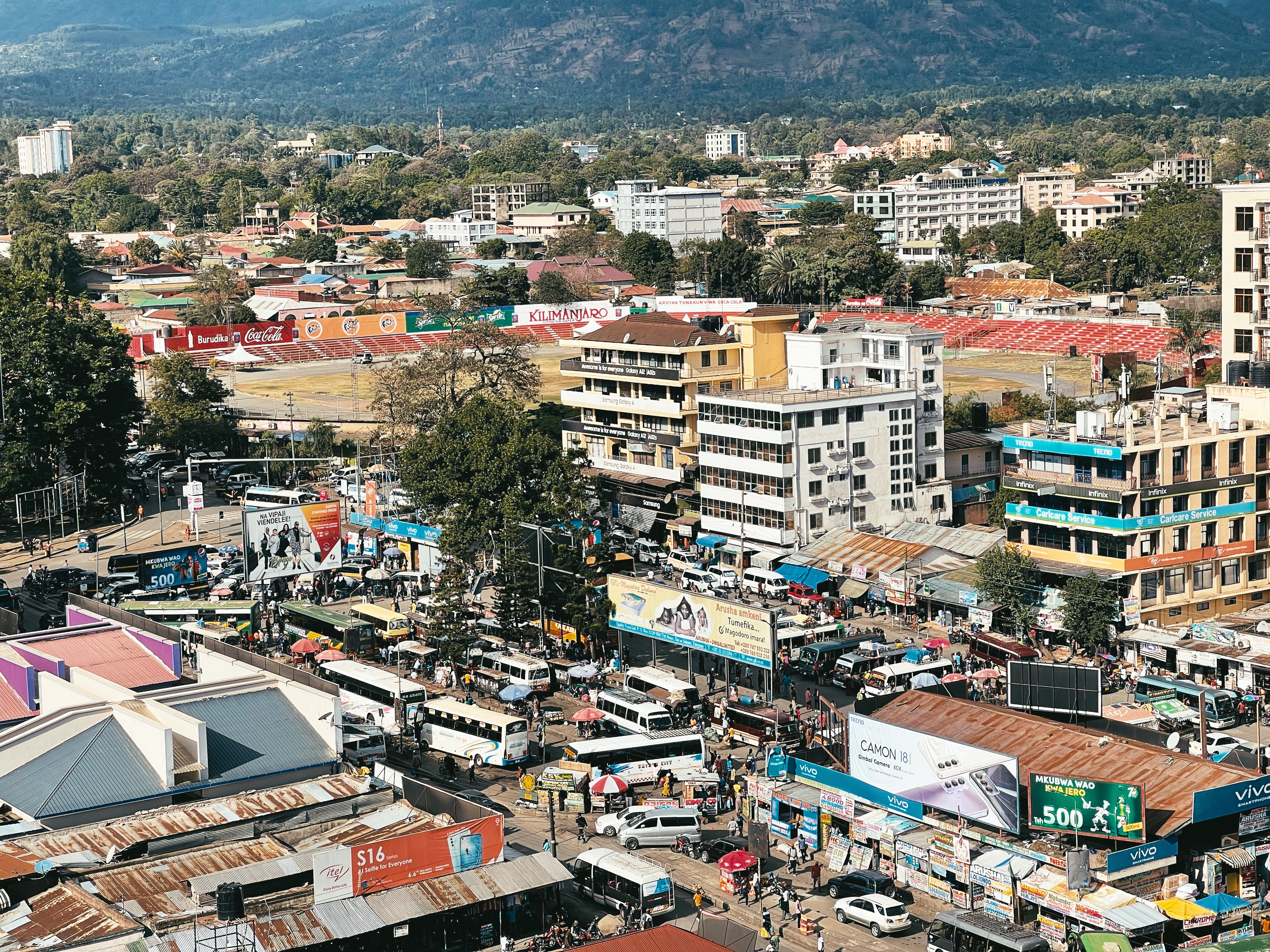
Arusha City Central Bus Terminal

Arusha is served by two airports: the Kilimanjaro International Airport for international air travellers, some 60 kilometres (37 mi) east, approximately halfway to Moshi. The airport provides international and domestic flights. Arusha Airport is a regional air hub in the west of the city, and serves more than 87,000 passengers yearly.

=== Road links ===
Travel by road can be done through privately run coaches (buses) to Nairobi, Dodoma, Babati, Morogoro, Tanga, Mbeya, Singida, Tabora, Mpanda, Kigoma, Mwanza, Bukoba, Iringa, and Dar es Salaam.

Arusha is on the Cape to Cairo Road. There was a marker in the 1930s in Arusha indicating the mid-point of the route. It is also on the Cairo-Cape Town Highway.

== Culture ==
The city hosts the National Natural History Museum, which contains three exhibits on early man, plants and animals of the region, and the history of the city. The Natural National History Museum used to be an administration outpost for the Germans in the 1900s. It was opened in 1987 as a public museum and displays important assets to the scientific community such as models of Australopithecus people, human ancestors that lived over 2 million years ago. It is also home to a giant tortoise, over 100 years old, which freely roams the grounds.

A small museum adjacent to the Uhuru monument displays information about the proceedings of the 1967 Arusha Declaration.

The Arusha Cultural Heritage Centre is a large privately run art gallery in a striking building, resembling the Guggenheim museum whilst drawing on African symbols (drum, spear, and shield). It holds a wide range of African art, including from the Tanzanian TingaTinga school. Exhibits are for sale and there is not a permanent collection.

== Places of worship ==
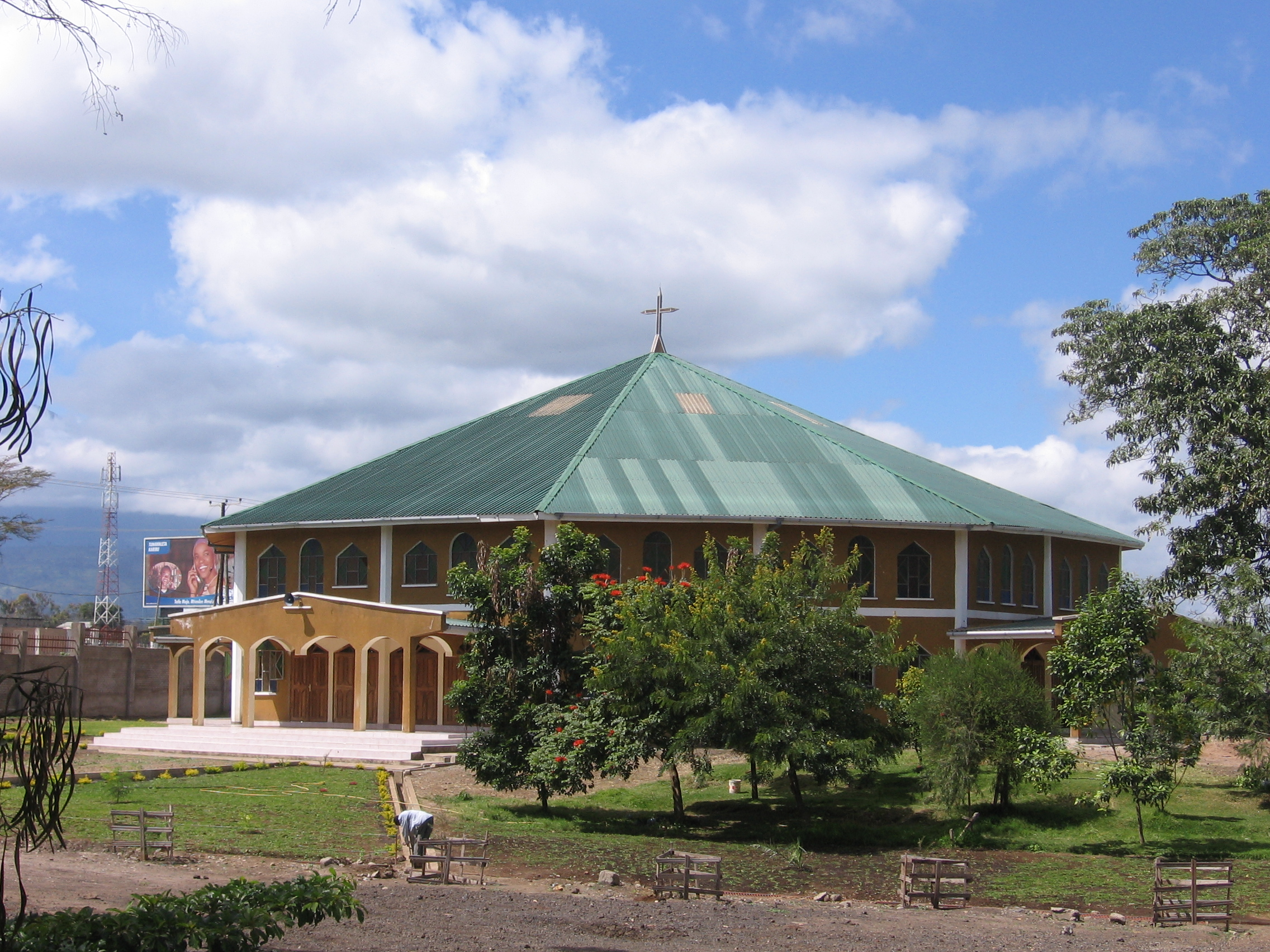
The Cathedral of Arusha (Catholic Church)

Places of worship include the majority Christian churches: Archdiocese of Arusha, Anglican Church of Tanzania, Evangelical Lutheran Church in Tanzania, Baptist Convention of Tanzania, and Assemblies of God. There are also Muslim mosques.

== Education ==
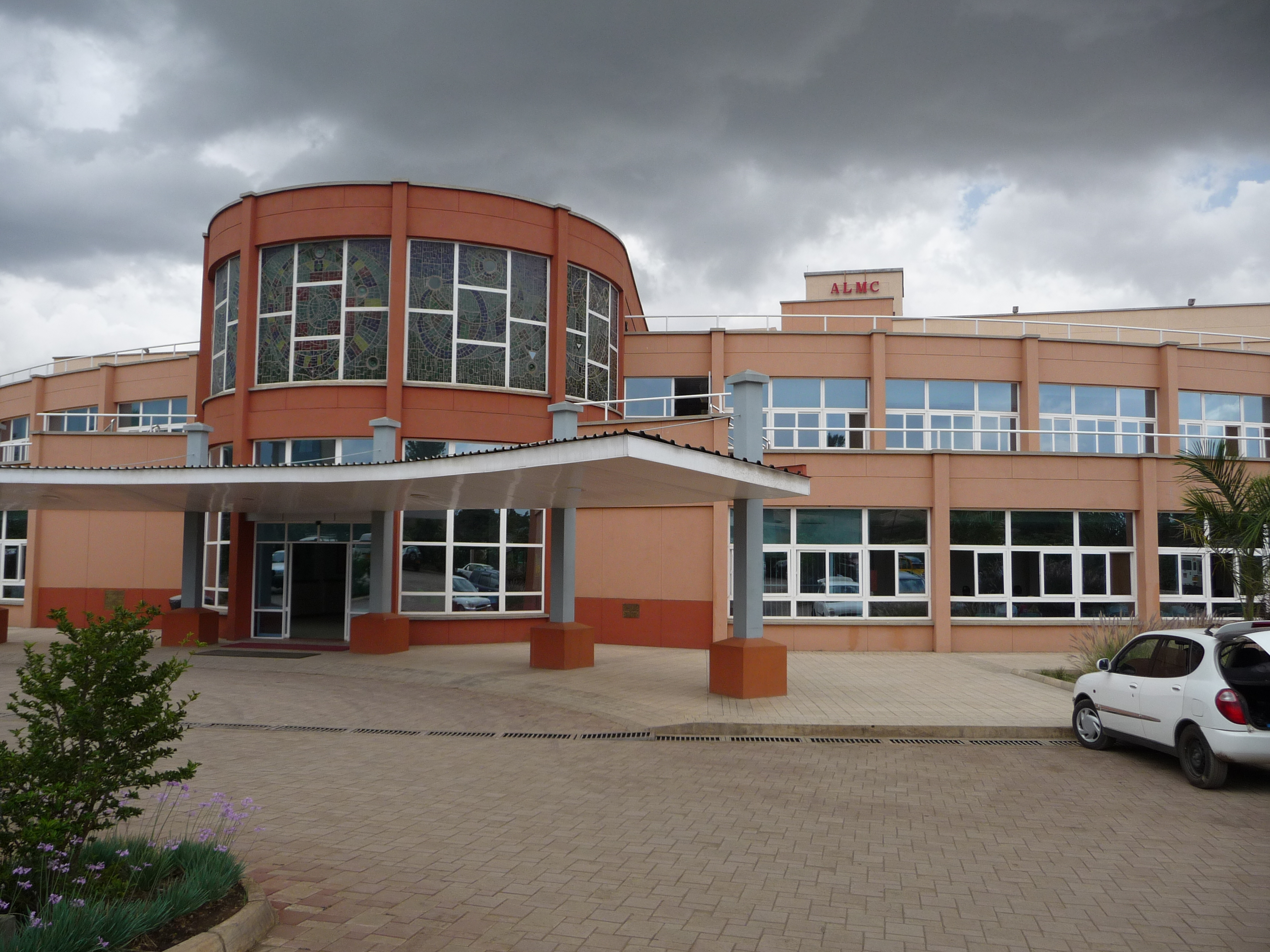
The Arusha Lutheran Medical Center in downtown Arusha.

Most Arushan children attend public schools located in almost every ward of the city. There are five international schools in and around Arusha: International School Moshi (Arusha Campus), Arusha Meru International School, Braeburn School, St Constantine's International School, and Kennedy House International School.

The city of Arusha is home to the National College of Tourism - Arusha Campus, Arusha Technical College, Tengeru Institute of community Development, The Nelson Mandela African Institute of Science and Technology, Eastern and Southern African Management Institute, MS Training Centre for Development Cooperation (MS-TCDC), The Institute of Accountancy Arusha, Forestry Training Institute, Olmotonyi, Tanzania Wildlife Research Institute, Tumaini University Makumira, and The Mount Meru University.

Arcadia University hosts a film course that has led to the creation of the Arusha African Film Festival, which allows people to come and watch films created by local people. The guidelines allows a multitude of filmmakers to be taken into account for awards, and each year a new theme is chosen for the festival. The AAFF is connected to the East African Film Festival, which also gives ample opportunity for awards and credit to young filmmakers.

== Geography and climate ==
Despite its proximity to the equator, Arusha's elevation of 1,400 metres (4,600 ft) on the southern slopes of Mount Meru keeps temperatures relatively low and alleviates humidity. Cool dry air is prevalent for much of the year. The temperature typically ranges between 10 and 30 °C (50 and 86 °F) with an average annual high temperature around 25 °C or 77 °F. It has distinct wet and dry seasons, and experiences an eastern prevailing wind from the Indian Ocean, a few hundred kilometres east. Under the Köppen climate classification system, it has a subtropical highland climate (Cwb). Areas away from Arusha to the south and west are classified as tropical savanna climate (Aw).

Climate data for Arusha
Month	Jan	Feb	Mar	Apr	May	Jun	Jul	Aug	Sep	Oct	Nov	Dec	Year
Mean daily maximum °C (°F)	28 (82)	28 (82)	27 (81)	25 (77)	22 (72)	21 (70)	20 (68)	22 (72)	24 (75)	26 (79)	27 (81)	27 (81)	25 (77)
Daily mean °C (°F)	19 (66)	19 (66)	19 (66)	19 (66)	16 (61)	14 (57)	14 (57)	15 (59)	16 (61)	18 (64)	18 (64)	18 (64)	17 (63)
Mean daily minimum °C (°F)	10 (50)	10 (50)	11 (52)	13 (55)	11 (52)	8 (46)	9 (48)	8 (46)	8 (46)	10 (50)	10 (50)	10 (50)	10 (50)
Average rainfall mm (inches)	50 (2.0)	80 (3.1)	170 (6.7)	360 (14.2)	210 (8.3)	30 (1.2)	10 (0.4)	10 (0.4)	20 (0.8)	30 (1.2)	110 (4.3)	100 (3.9)	1,180 (46.5)
Source: Weatherbase

The record high since records began in 2000 is 39 °C or 102.2 °F. The record low is 7 °C or 44.6 °F. Arusha averages 29.8 days per year above 32 °C or 89.6 °F – all between November and March. Arusha's annual rainfall average is 1,180 millimetres (46.46 in), mostly coming during the long rainy season from March to May. Areas immediately to the north and northeast of Arusha can see more rain and cooler temperatures due to the influence of Mt. Meru, whose rain shadow extends toward the southeast side of the mountain.

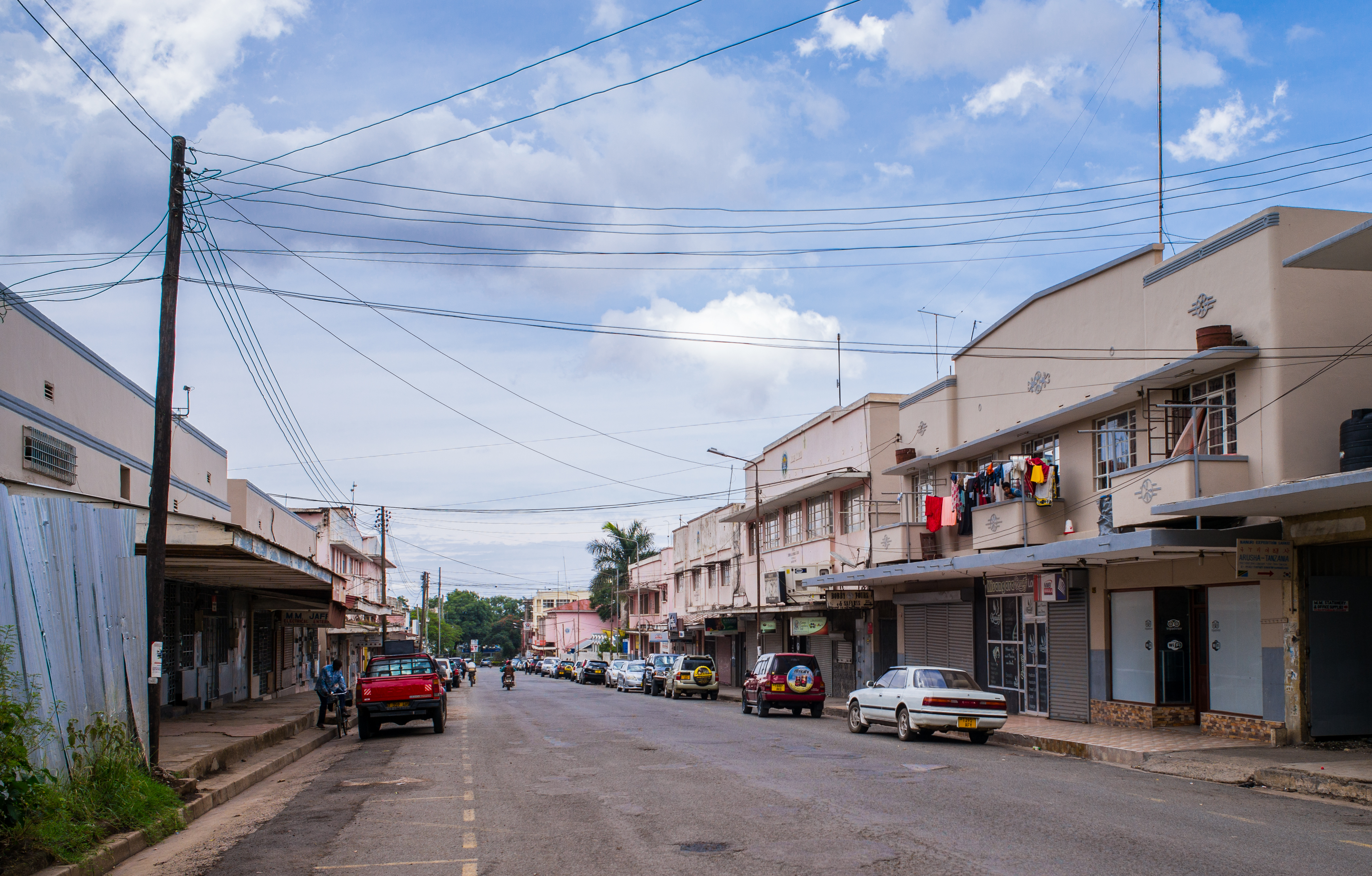
A street in Arusha town.

Arusha and the northern highlands of Tanzania experience a bimodal rainfall pattern, with two rainy seasons. Many crops are planted twice per year. The long masika rains from March through May are more reliable in Arusha than in surrounding areas because of the influence of Mt. Meru. The short vuli rains are less reliable, usually coming in November and December. The dry kiangazi season is June to October.

Higher elevation areas north and northeast of the city are home to farmers growing bananas, coffee, cabbage, potatoes, carrots, leafy greens, and other vegetables.

Cultivation in areas to the northwest, west, southwest, south, and southeast focuses on maize, beans and wheat. There is a significant horticulture industry, with several companies growing flowers for export to Europe.

== Sports ==
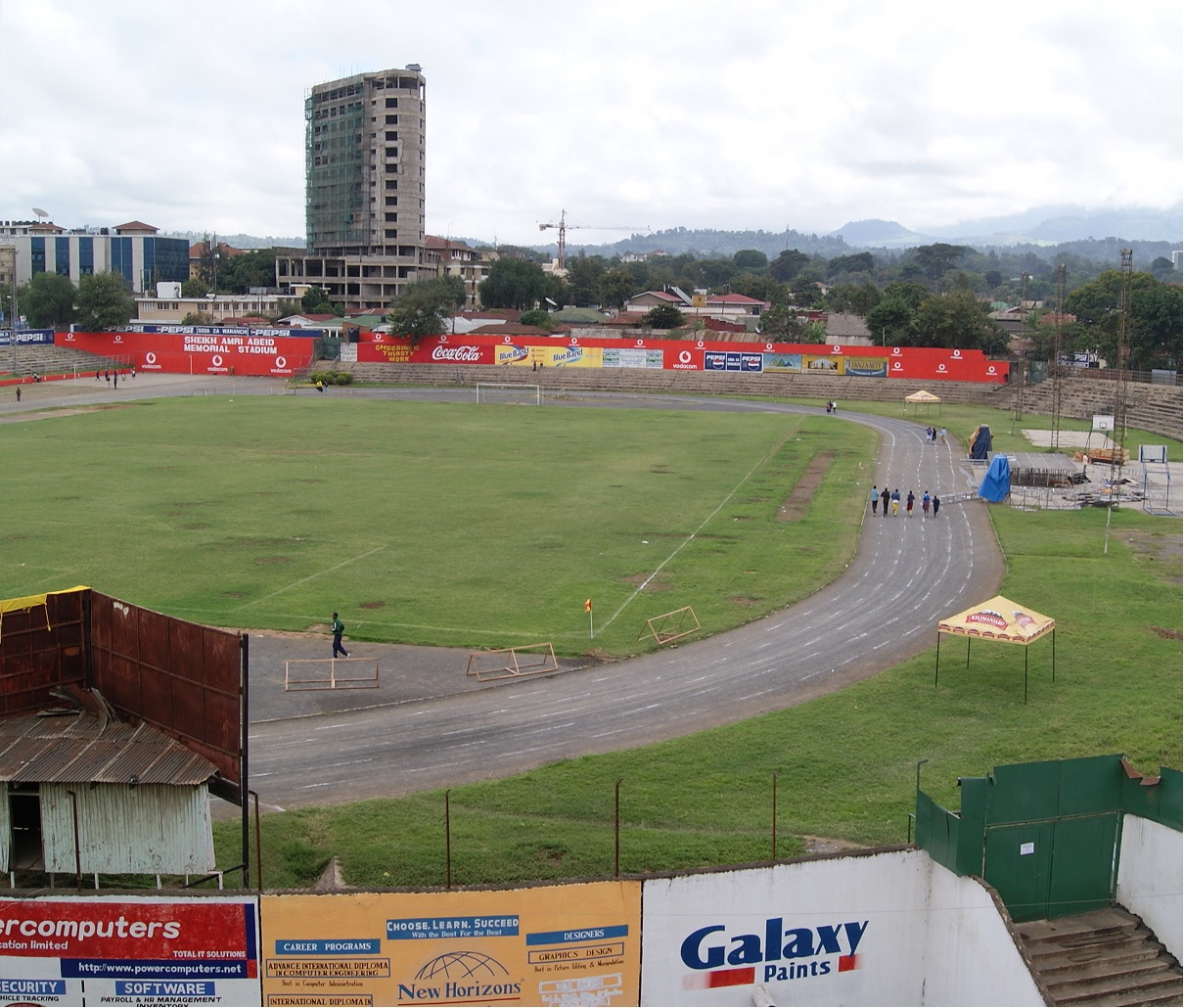
The Sheikh Amri Abeid Memorial Stadium

The city is home to the Tanzanian rugby national team. The city hosts international rugby matches as well. Joshua Peterson, who played for the national team, was the second youngest international rugby player ever, behind Jonny Wilkinson. Southern Pool A of the 2007 Castel Beer Trophy was hosted here as well.

The city is home to Arusha FC, which plays its home matches at Sheikh Amri Abeid Memorial Stadium and represents Arusha in Tanzanian league football.

The city also hosted the Mount Meru Marathon, held from 1985 to 2004. The "all-comers" record for the fastest marathon performance in Tanzania, 2:13:46, was set at the event by former long-distance runner Benedict Ako on August 1, 1993.

On 21 May 2011, the Drake Bulldogs beat the CONADEIP All-Stars by 17–7 in the first ever American football game in Tanzania.

Arusha is home for the Arusha Motor Sports Club (AMSC), which provides motor entertainment for the city of Arusha. It was created in 1996 with the purpose of providing "motor rallying", which was a new concept at the time for Tanzania, as a new form of entertainment. The AMSC is the largest club in Tanzania that invites foreign competitors to rally and compete for AMSC.

On August 10, 2022, Arusha held the 44th CAF Ordinal General Assembly, which also included the launch of the new Africa Super League.

== In popular culture ==
Arusha was the setting for the 1962 film Hatari!, directed by Howard Hawks and starring John Wayne. Parts of the film were shot at Momela Lakes.

Arusha is alleged to be midway between Cape Town and Cairo.

Arusha city has 5 popular gated communities:

1: Dolly Estate - Located at Usa River area focusing on country living. Known for a shear number of expats and wealthy Tanzanians.

2: PPF – Located at Njiro area near the Village supermarket.

3: Kwa Mawala – Located at a quiet side of Majengo area near the popular Aim mall, which has Village supermarket, a movie theater and a few eateries.

4: Westlands – Located at Sakina area with picturesque view of Mount Meru. Inside the gate includes a school, Millennium luxury apartments, rental houses, two local shops, TAG, and two award winning tourist lodges (Tumaini Homestay Arusha Lodge, and Karibu Heritage Lodge). It's close to the main road (Arusha Nairobi road) walking distance to notable mini supermarkets like Mendaz, Mariam Supermarket, a police station, St. Joseph Health Care International and Sakina Dispensary.

5: Kili Golf – Located near the outskirts of Arusha.

Arusha is also known to have the largest collection of Old Skool cars ( Magari ya Kizamani) and home to Popular car clubs like Tanzania Old Skool car club, Land Rover Tanzania club (hosted the biggest Land Rover festival ever seen in Africa), Tanzania VW classics etc.

While the town doesn't appear itself, it is shown in Halo 3 as a location on the Tterrab Highway Authority signs.

== Notable residents ==
- Edward Lowassa, Chama Cha Mapinduzi, politician and former Prime Minister of Tanzania
- Peter K. Palangyo, diplomat and novelist, author of the novel Dying in the Sun
- Frida Amani, Tanzanian Musician, presenter and
- Edward Moringe Sokoine, former prime minister of Tanzania

== Sister cities ==
- Durham, North Carolina, United States
- Kansas City, Missouri, United States
- Mürzzuschlag, Austria
- Tifariti, Western Sahara

== See also ==
- Arusha Accords
- Arusha Cultural Heritage Centre
- Arusha Declaration
- Arusha National Park
- Arusha Region
- Lake Manyara
- Longido
- Mount Meru (Tanzania)
- Selian
- Tanzania
- United Nations Security Council resolution
