= Lake Manyara National Park =

National park in Tanzania

- IUCN category II (national park)
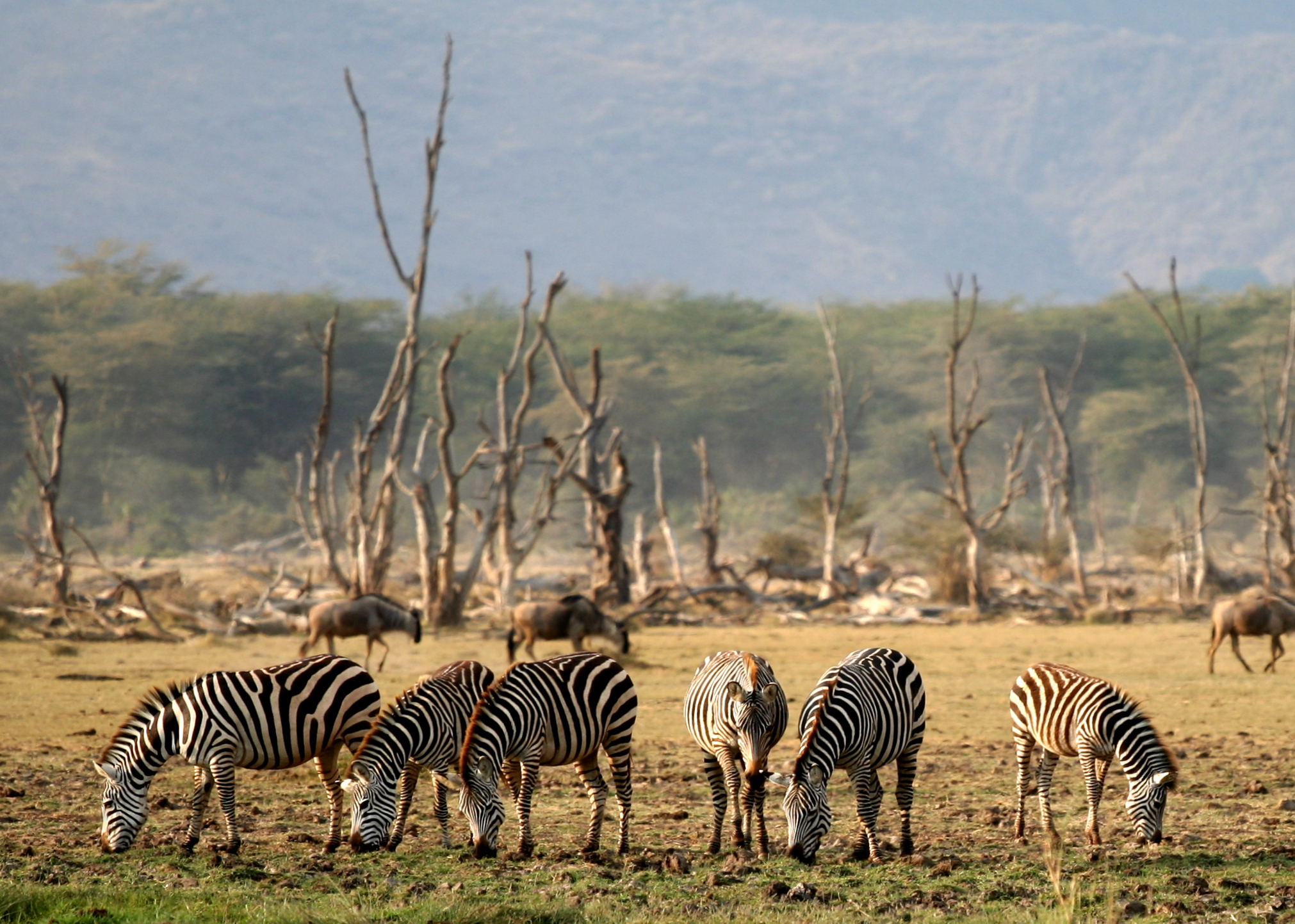
- Plains zebras in Lake Manyara National Park

- Location within Tanzania
- Location: Arusha Region and Manyara Region, Tanzania
- Nearest city: City of Arusha, Babati
- Coordinates: 3°30′S 36°00′E
- Area: 648 km^{2} (250 sq mi)
- Established: 1960
- Visitors: 178,473 (in 2012)
- Governing body: Tanzania National Parks Authority

Lake Manyara National Park is a national park in Tanzania located between Lake Manyara and the Great Rift Valley in the Arusha and Manyara Regions. It is administered by the Tanzania National Parks Authority, and covers an area of 325 km^{2} (125 sq mi) including about 230 km^{2} (89 sq mi) lake surface. More than 350 bird species have been observed on the lake.

== History ==
Since the 1920s, Lake Manyara area was used for sports hunting. In 1957, a game reserve was established. In 1960, it was given National Park status and in 1974 about 550 ha (1,400 acres) were added to the southern end. The majority of the land area of the park is a narrow strip running between the Gregory Rift wall to the west and Lake Manyara, an alkaline lake, to the east. The national park only includes the northwest quadrant of the lake, about 200 km^{2} (77 sq mi). It is part of the much larger Lake Manyara Biosphere Reserve, established in 1981 by UNESCO as part of its Man and the Biosphere Programme.

== Climate ==
There are two rainy seasons - "short rains" from November to December and the "long rains" from March to May. The wettest month (with the highest rainfall) is April (161 mm (6.3 in) and it also has the highest number of rainy days (19 days). The driest months (with the lowest rainfall) are July, August and September (1 mm (0.039 in). September also has the lowest average number of rainy days (2 days). The warmest months (with the highest average high temperature) are January, February and March, averaging 30 °C (86 °F). Months with the lowest average high temperature are June and July, averaging 25 °C (77 °F). The adjacent highlands tend to be cooler with more rainfall.

Climate data for Lake Manyara
| Month | Jan | Feb | Mar | Apr | May | Jun | Jul | Aug | Sep | Oct | Nov | Dec | Year |
|---|---|---|---|---|---|---|---|---|---|---|---|---|---|
| Mean daily maximum °C (°F) | 30.0 (86.0) | 30.0 (86.0) | 30.0 (86.0) | 27.0 (80.6) | 26.0 (78.8) | 25.0 (77.0) | 25.0 (77.0) | 26.0 (78.8) | 28.0 (82.4) | 29.0 (84.2) | 29.0 (84.2) | 29.0 (84.2) | 27.8 (82.1) |
| Mean daily minimum °C (°F) | 16.0 (60.8) | 17.0 (62.6) | 17.0 (62.6) | 18.0 (64.4) | 17.0 (62.6) | 15.0 (59.0) | 14.0 (57.2) | 15.0 (59.0) | 15.0 (59.0) | 16.0 (60.8) | 17.0 (62.6) | 16.0 (60.8) | 16.1 (61.0) |
| Average rainfall mm (inches) | 60.0 (2.36) | 80.0 (3.15) | 114.0 (4.49) | 161.0 (6.34) | 36.0 (1.42) | 2.0 (0.08) | 1.0 (0.04) | 1.0 (0.04) | 1.0 (0.04) | 16.0 (0.63) | 71.0 (2.80) | 75.0 (2.95) | 618 (24.34) |
| Average rainy days | 12.0 | 11.0 | 15.0 | 19.0 | 13.0 | 4.0 | 3.0 | 3.0 | 2.0 | 5.0 | 12.0 | 14.0 | 113 |
| Mean monthly sunshine hours | 248.0 | 226.0 | 248.0 | 210.0 | 217.0 | 210.0 | 217.0 | 217.0 | 240.0 | 279.0 | 240.0 | 248.0 | 2,800 |
| Percentage possible sunshine | 67 | 67 | 67 | 58 | 58 | 58 | 58 | 58 | 67 | 75 | 67 | 67 | 64 |
| Average ultraviolet index | 12 | 12 | 12 | 12 | 12 | 11 | 11 | 12 | 12 | 12 | 12 | 12 | 12 |
Source: Weather Atlas

Climate data for Lake Manyara
| Month | Jan | Feb | Mar | Apr | May | Jun | Jul | Aug | Sep | Oct | Nov | Dec | Year |
|---|---|---|---|---|---|---|---|---|---|---|---|---|---|
| Mean daily daylight hours | 12.0 | 12.0 | 12.0 | 12.0 | 12.0 | 12.0 | 12.0 | 12.0 | 12.0 | 12.0 | 12.0 | 12.0 | 12.0 |
Source: Weather Atlas

== Location ==
Lake Manyara National Park is located 126 km (78 mi) south west of Arusha and can be reached by car in an hour and a half. The park can also be reached from Babati the capital of Manyara Region. Lake Manyara Airport is nearby. To the south, situated on the escarpment above the park, is the 35,399 ha Marang Forest Reserve. To the east is the Kwa Kuchinja Wildlife Migration corridor, which allows wildlife to migrate between the near-by Tarangire National Park to the southeast, Lake Manyara to the west, and the Engaruka Basin to the north. Within the Kwa Kuchinja corridor are several villages. Further from the lake and outside of village land is the 45,000-acre Manyara Ranch, a former livestock ranch, managed by the Tanzania Land Conservation Trust since 2001 and an important part of the corridor allowing wildlife movement between Tarangire and Lake Manyara national parks.

Lake Manyara National Park is part of the Lake Manyara Biosphere Reserve. Lake Manyara, including the areas within and outside the national park, along with the Marang Forest Reserve on the adjacent uplands are included in the Lake Manyara Important Bird Area.

== Topography ==
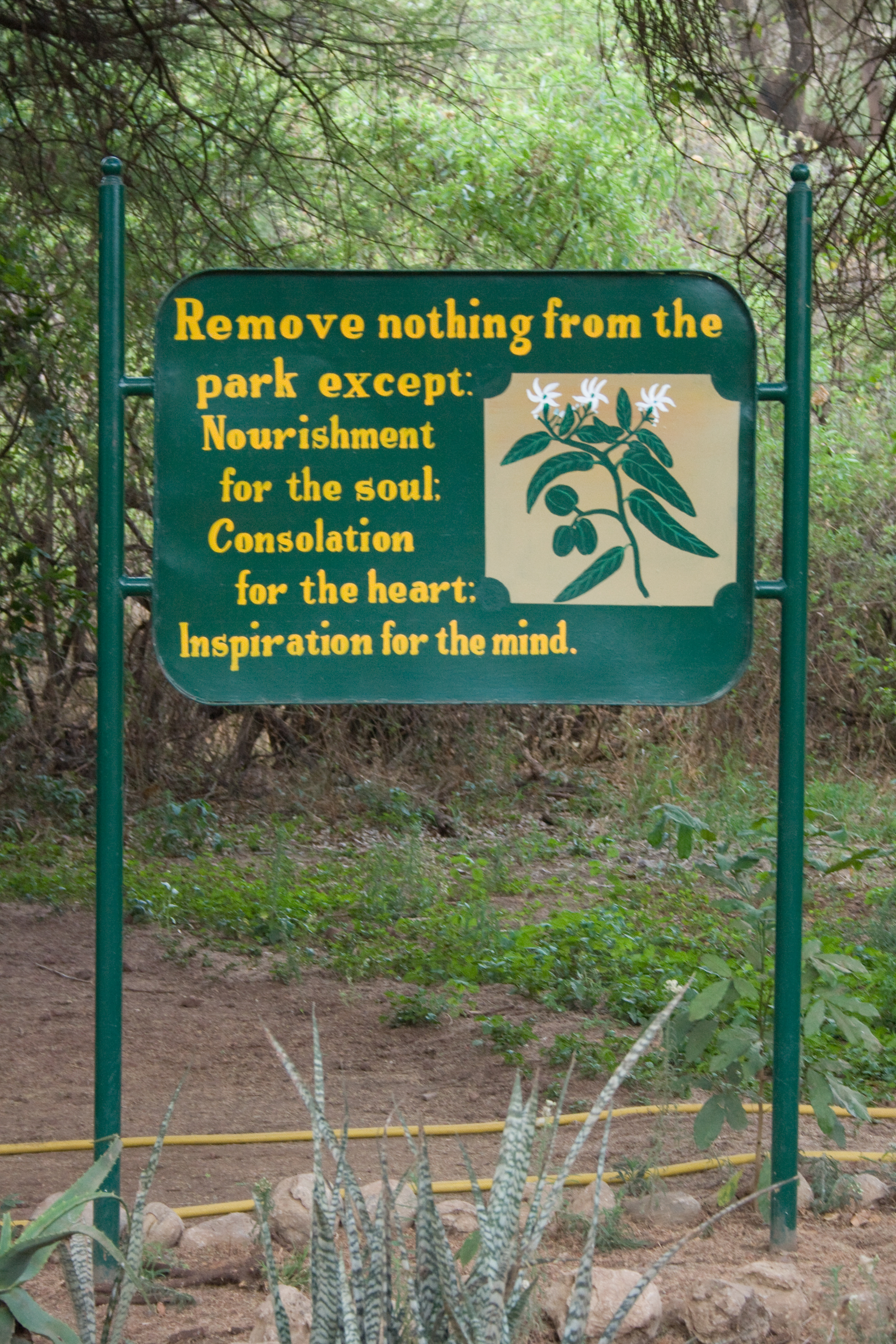
Lake Manyara National Park philosophy

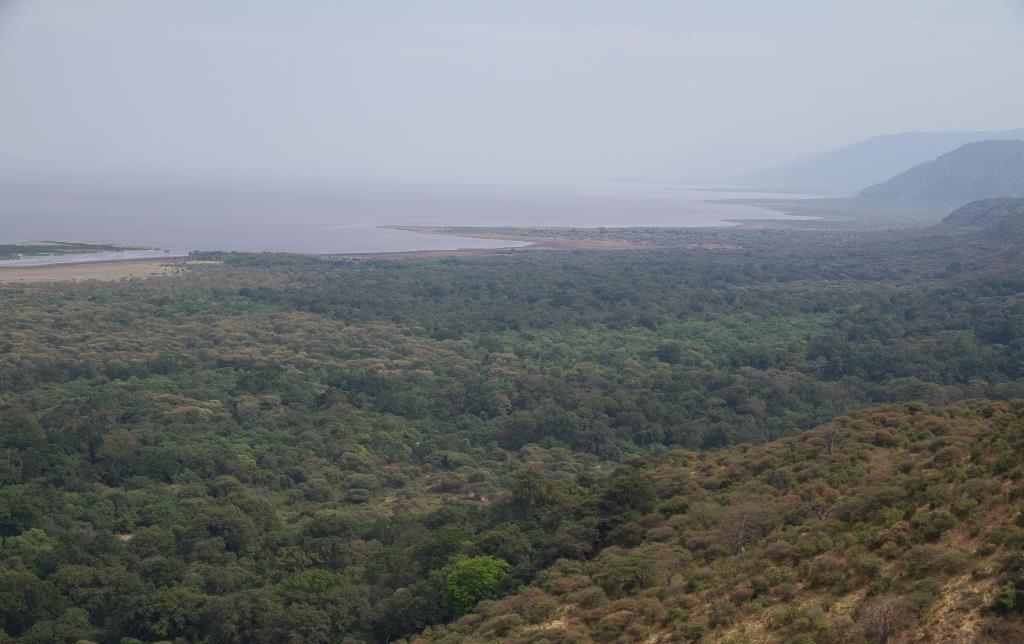
Overlooking Lake Manyara National Park

Lake Manyara is a shallow alkaline lake at an altitude of 960 m (3,150 ft), formed in a depression in the Rift Valley System. When full, the lake is a maximum of 10 ft (3.0 m) deep and covers two-thirds of the park. The lake has no outflow, but is fed by underground springs and by several permanent streams that drain surrounding Ngorongoro Highlands. The lake's depth and the area it covers fluctuates significantly. In extreme dry periods the surface area of the lake shrinks as the waters evaporate and at times the lake has dried up completely. In 2010, a bathymetry survey showed the lake to have an average depth 0.81 m (2 ft 8 in), and a maximum depth of about 1.18 m (3 ft 10 in). At its maximum during the wet season, the lake is 40 km (25 mi) wide by 15 km (9.3 mi) with a maximum depth of 3.7 m (12 ft).

Beside the lake are extensive marshlands, saline flats (that expand in the dry season as the surface area of the lake shrinks) and a grassy floodplain. At the area near the park gate there is a tall forest, sustained by groundwater, dominated by evergreen fig and mahogany trees. On the west side of the park, the rocky escarpment of the rift valley wall rises steeply to 1,219–1,829 m (3,999–6,001 ft). Large African baobab trees (Adansonia digitata) are scattered on the slopes. A narrow zone of dense acacia woodland grows at the base of the rift wall, on materials washed down the face.

Other features include a hippopotamus pool at the northern end of the lake and two hot springs, one near the centre of the park and the other near the southern edge. There is a hot water spring on the western shores of lake Manyara called Maji Moto hot water springs. This 60 °C geothermal feature is formed by underground water that passes through hot volcanic magma rocks of the great rift valley.

== Fauna and flora ==
=== Vegetation ===
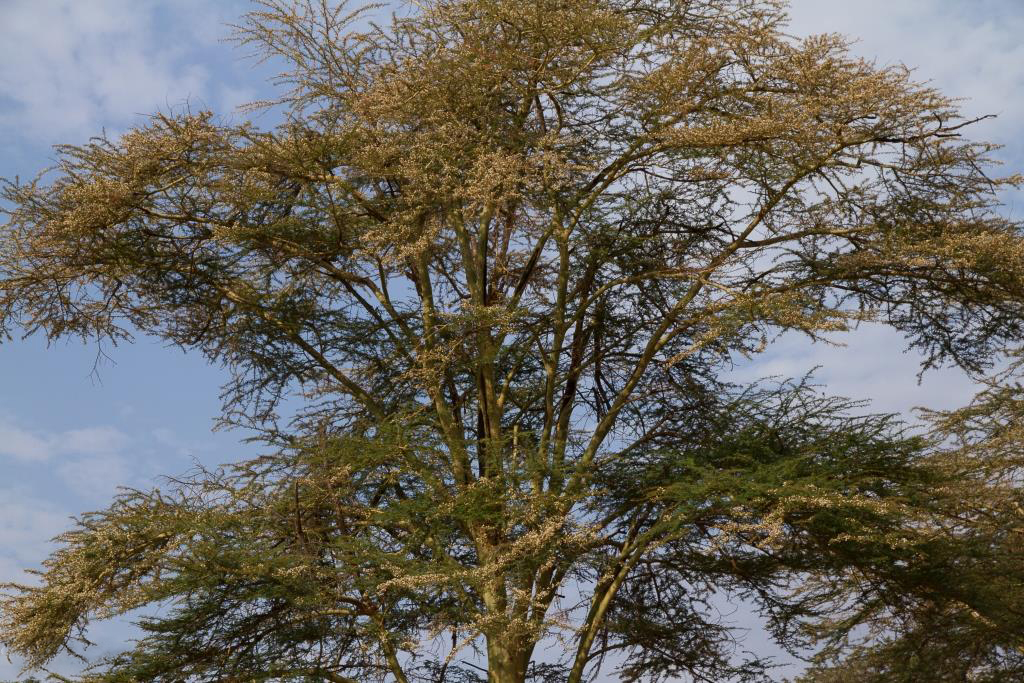
A fever acacia in Lake Manyara National Park

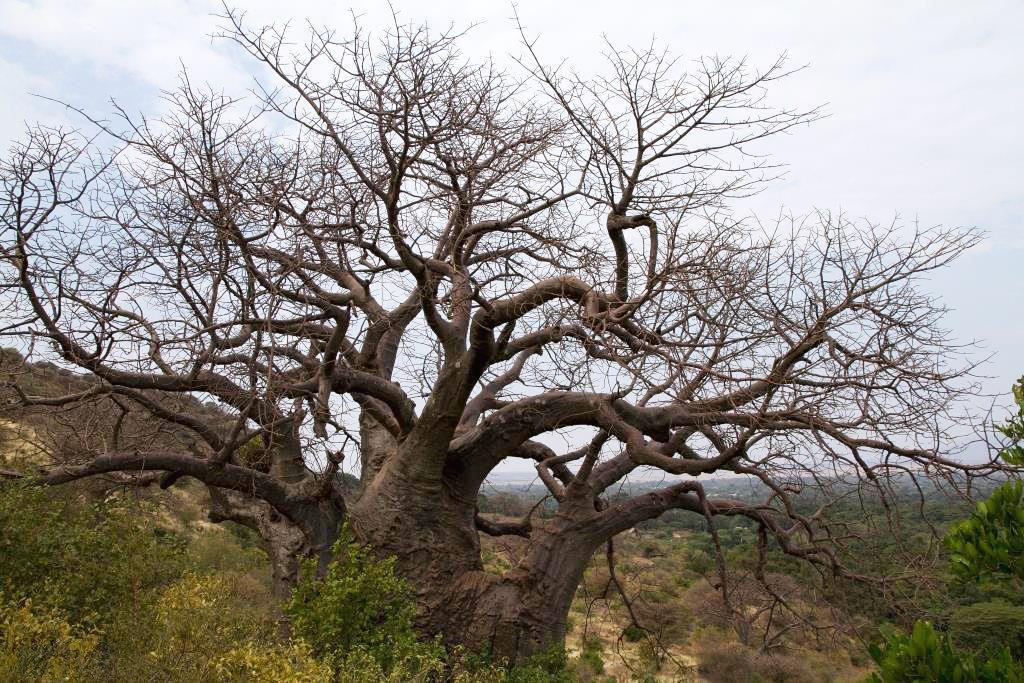
An African Baobab in Lake Manyara National Park.

The flora of Lake Manyara National Park is diverse, with over 670 flowering plant and fern species documented. Most are widespread species; there are few rare or endemic species.

The park has a variety of diverse habitats. Rivers flowing off the escarpment and perennial springs below the rift wall support tall, evergreen groundwater forests dominated by Trichilia roka with Broad-Leaved Croton (Croton macrostachyus), sycamore fig (Ficus sycomorus), quinine tree (Rauvolfia afra) and forest toad-tree (Tabernaemontana ventricosa). Trees are densest in gorges, along the edge of streams and in areas where springs emerge. Growing at the edge of the groundwater forest are dense stands of yellow fever trees (Vachellia xanthophloea) and the palm Phoenix reclinata.

Woodlands on the western shore of the lake dominated by Acacia and Commiphora species are also supported by groundwater. Trees are spaced irregularly; densest in zones of seepage and along drainage channels. The dominant tree, Acacia tortilis, grows to about 10m tall with a flat-topped canopy. There is a patchy and diverse understory shrub layer.

Extensive swamps have formed where the Simba River and its tributaries flow into the north end of Lake Manyara and smaller swamps have formed elsewhere, associated with the minor rivers flowing off the walls of the rift valley. A number of aquatic species have been documented, including two species of water lily (Nymphaea nouchali var. caerulea and N. lotus) and extensive mats of water lettuce (Pistia stratiotes). Cattails (Typha sp.) forms pure stands in the northern swamps and various Cyperus species are found around the edges of the swamps. Cyperus immensus forms dense clumps in areas with flooding by fresh water. Cyperus laevigatus is prominent along the lake shore in areas where the alkaline water table is high, in areas of shallow lagoons enclosed behind sand ridges and flanking river deltas.

Grasslands are dominated by Cynodon dactylon in dry locations, or by Sporobolus spicatus, often in association with Sporobolus consimilis on the alkaline lake flats. Sporobolus spicatus is dominant on exposed lakebed and can be very extensive during low lake levels, becoming restricted to a narrow zone above the high water mark when lake levels are high. There are extensive areas of Psilolemma jaegeri grasslands outside the park, along the eastern shore of the lake. Vegetation on the escarpment is characterized by Ruellia megachlamys and African baobab trees (Adansonia digitata).

=== Birds ===
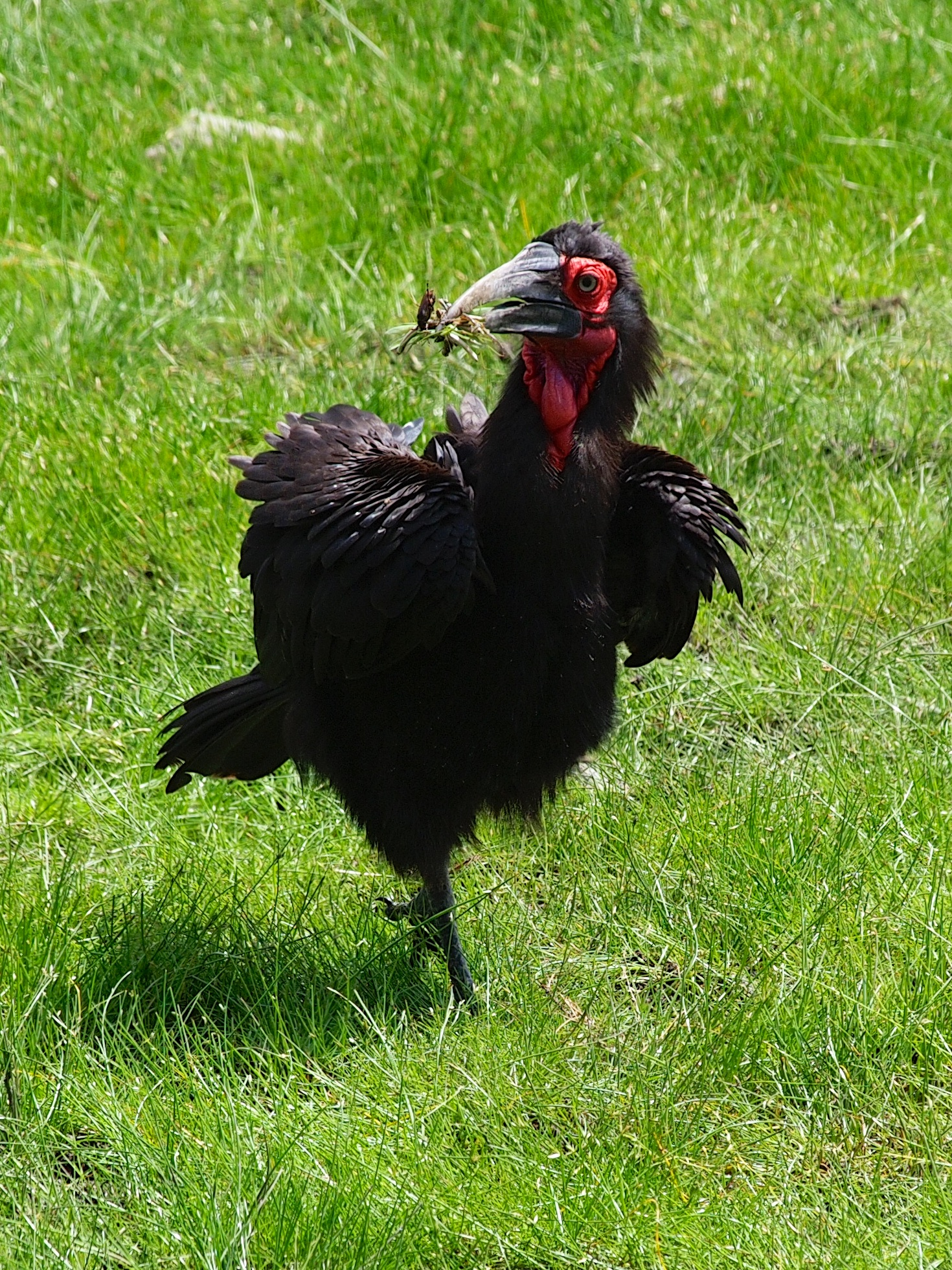
Southern ground hornbill at Lake Manyara National Park

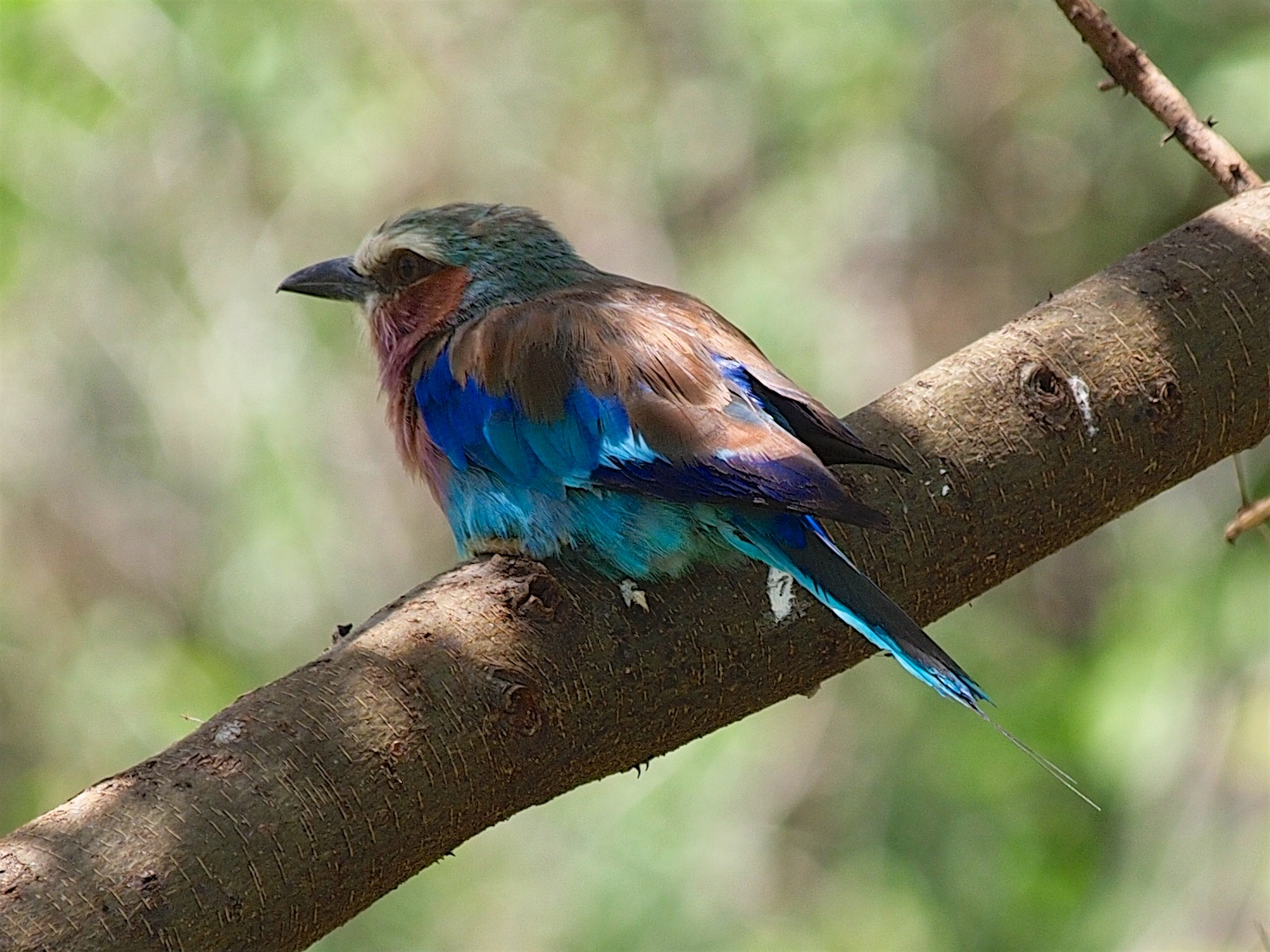
Lilac-breasted roller

Lake Manyara National Park is known for flocks of thousands flamingos that feed along the edge of the lake in the wet season. In 1991 there were an estimated 1,900,000 non-breeding lesser flamingo (Phoeniconaias minor) individuals and 40,000 greater flamingo (Phoenicopterus roseus). Great white pelican (Pelecanus onocrotalus) can also be present in large numbers (an estimated 200,000 individuals in 1991) and in all there has been an estimated 1,000,000-2,499,999 individual water birds, however, only 78,320 birds were counted in 1994. The groundwater forest to the north of the lake, and largely within the National Park, is a well-known breeding site for thousands of pink-backed pelican (Pelecanus rufescens) and yellow-billed stork (Mycteria ibis) along with smaller numbers of Marabou stork (Leptoptilos crumeniferus) and grey heron (Ardea cinerea). Over 40 species of birds of prey are documented, including palm-nut vulture (Gypohierax angolensis) and Ayre's hawk eagle (Hieraaetus ayresii). In all, more than 390 species of birds have been documented in the national park, although in the dry season, flamingos and other water birds are usually found only in small numbers.

=== Mammals ===
Populations of large migratory mammals that are concentrated primarily in Tarangire National Park, but also move through Lake Manyara National Park include blue wildebeest, zebra, Thomson's gazelle and Grant's gazelle. Large herds of wildebeest and other plains game from the Mto wa Mbu Game Controlled Area enter the park from the north for short periods. Wildebeest exclusively graze the alkaline grasslands around the lake, and numbers are highest during the dry season, dropping to small resident populations in the wet season. Herbivores of Lake Manyara National Park include plains zebra, Cape bushbuck, waterbuck, impala, African buffalo, Masai giraffe, hippopotamus, baboon, common warthog, and African bush elephant.

Studies in the 1980s found this to be one of the areas with the highest wildlife biomass in Africa, but elephant numbers had fallen by 75% between 1985 and 1991 as a result of illegal hunting, with numbers rebounding to around 200 in 1996. Lake Manyara was also once known for its high population of south-central black rhinoceros, but none were present by 1996. Similarly, reedbuck were present in 1984, but no individuals were found in a 1996 census. Predators of Lake Manyara National Park include lion, African leopard, African wildcat, spotted hyena, black-backed jackal, bat-eared fox, serval, honey badger, African civet, genet (Genetta) species and several mongoose species. East African cheetah and African golden cat are sighted occasionally.

=== Fish ===
Lake Manyara is the type locality for the endangered fish Oreochromis amphimelas, a species of in the cichlid family. It is endemic to Tanzania, and also lives in a few more saline lakes with closed basins. Exploitation is prohibited in the parts of Lake Manyara within the National Park and the protected park areas provide important seed stock for the replenishment of fished populations.

=== Butterflies ===
Over 180 species of butterflies have been documented in the park.

== See also ==
- Lake Manyara Biosphere Reserve
- List of protected areas of Tanzania
