= Lake Manyara Biosphere Reserve =

Biosphere Reserve in Arusha Region, Tanzania

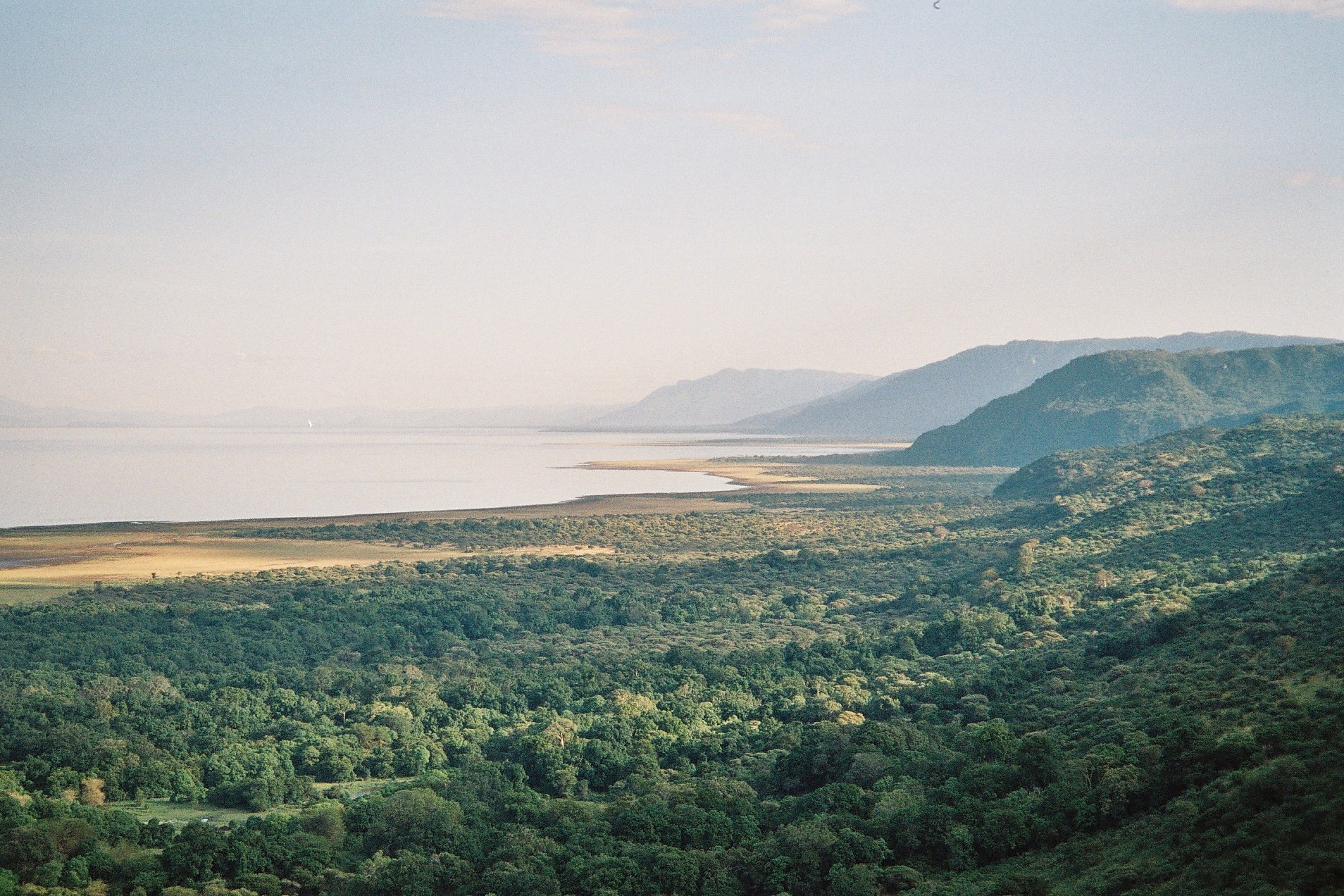
- Lake Manyara

- Location within Tanzania
- Location: Tanzania
- Coordinates: 3°30′0″S 36°0′0″E
- Area: 2,833,000 hectares (10,940 sq mi)
- Established: 1981
- Governing body: Lake Manyara National Park

The Lake Manyara Biosphere Reserve (established 1981) is a UNESCO Biosphere Reserve in the depression of the East African Rift Valley in the Lake Manyara Basin in Arusha Region of northern Tanzania. The reserve is managed by Tanzanian Lake Manyara National Park.

== History ==
The biosphere reserve was part of the UNESCO-MAB project "Biosphere Reserves for Biodiversity Conservation and Sustainable Development in Anglophone Africa (BRAAF)" which had the objective to ensure the long-term conservation of biodiversity in including local population in its sustainable use. Several BRAAF projects aimed to promote income-generating activities such as bee-keeping or to control the tick infestation in the livestock of the pastoralist communities.

As of 1999, the human population in the biosphere reserve is estimated to over 250,000 people. With most indigenous people practicing pastoralism and agriculture, these are the most important socio-economic activities in the area. Ethnic groups of the Lake Manyara region are the Maasai, the Iraqw and the Barabaig. Most of the immigrants in the region depend on tourism. Poaching of wildlife for meat and trophies, illegal fishing, selling of firewood and charcoal constitute threats to the biodiversity in the biosphere reserve.

== Geography ==
The reserve's surface area is 2,833,000 hectares (10,940 sq mi). The core area is 33,000 hectares (130 sq mi), of which Lake Manyara is 10,000 hectares (39 sq mi), surrounded by buffer zone(s) of 1,000,000 hectares (3,900 sq mi) and transition area(s) of 1,800,000 hectares (6,900 sq mi).

Below the rift wall, perennial springs in the north support a ground water forest (characterized by Trichilia roka and Croton macrostachyus or the yellow fever tree (Acacia xanthophloea). Riverine habitats, swamps, woodland and alkaline grasslands also characterize the area.

== See also ==
- Lake Manyara topics
- Manyara Region

== Sources ==
This article incorporates text from a free content work (license statement/permission). Text taken from UNESCO - MAB Biosphere Reserves Directory, UNESCO, UNESCO.
