= Arusha Cultural Heritage Centre =

Heritage centre in Arusha, Tanzania

Coordinates: 3.3770°S 36.6582°E

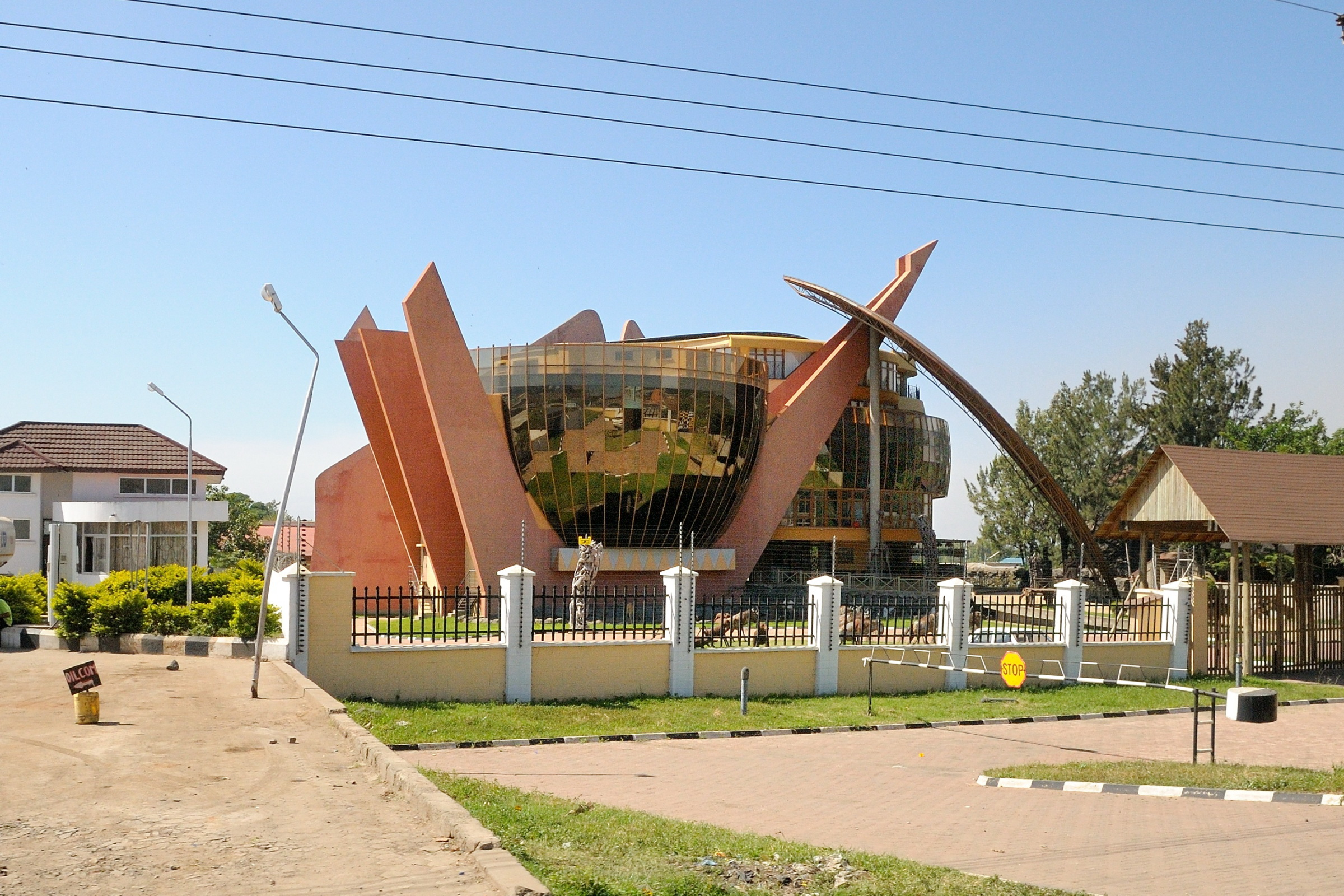
Arusha Cultural Heritage Centre

The Arusha Cultural Heritage Centre is located in Arusha, Tanzania. It is a place where art and artifacts from the past and present of Tanzania and other East African countries can be viewed in a single compound. The centre boasts various carvings, gemstones, artifacts, clothing and books.

The Centre has hosted the following world statesmen:

- Norway's King Harald, Queen Sonja and Princess Märtha Louise
- South Africa's Thabo Mbeki and Zanele Mbeki
- United States's Bill Clinton
- United States's George W. Bush
