= Arusha Accords =

Arusha Accords refers to two separate political agreements, negotiated in Arusha, Tanzania:

- Arusha Accords (Rwanda), a 1993 agreement
- Arusha Accords (Burundi), a 2000 agreement

It may also refer to:

- The Arusha Accord, a United Kingdom metal band

== See also ==
- Arusha Declaration, a 1967 declaration calling for African socialism and other reforms
- Arusha Agreement, a 1969 agreement with the European Communities
