= Selian River =

River in Tanzania

Coordinates: 3.31432728°S 36.63793916°E

Selian is a small river which runs off the southern slopes of Mount Meru in the northern Arusha region of Tanzania, East Africa. The town of Arusha resides to the east of Selian River.

The river eventually runs into the Burka stream, below the Burka Springs.
