= Lake Manyara =

Alkaline lake in Arusha Region, Tanzania

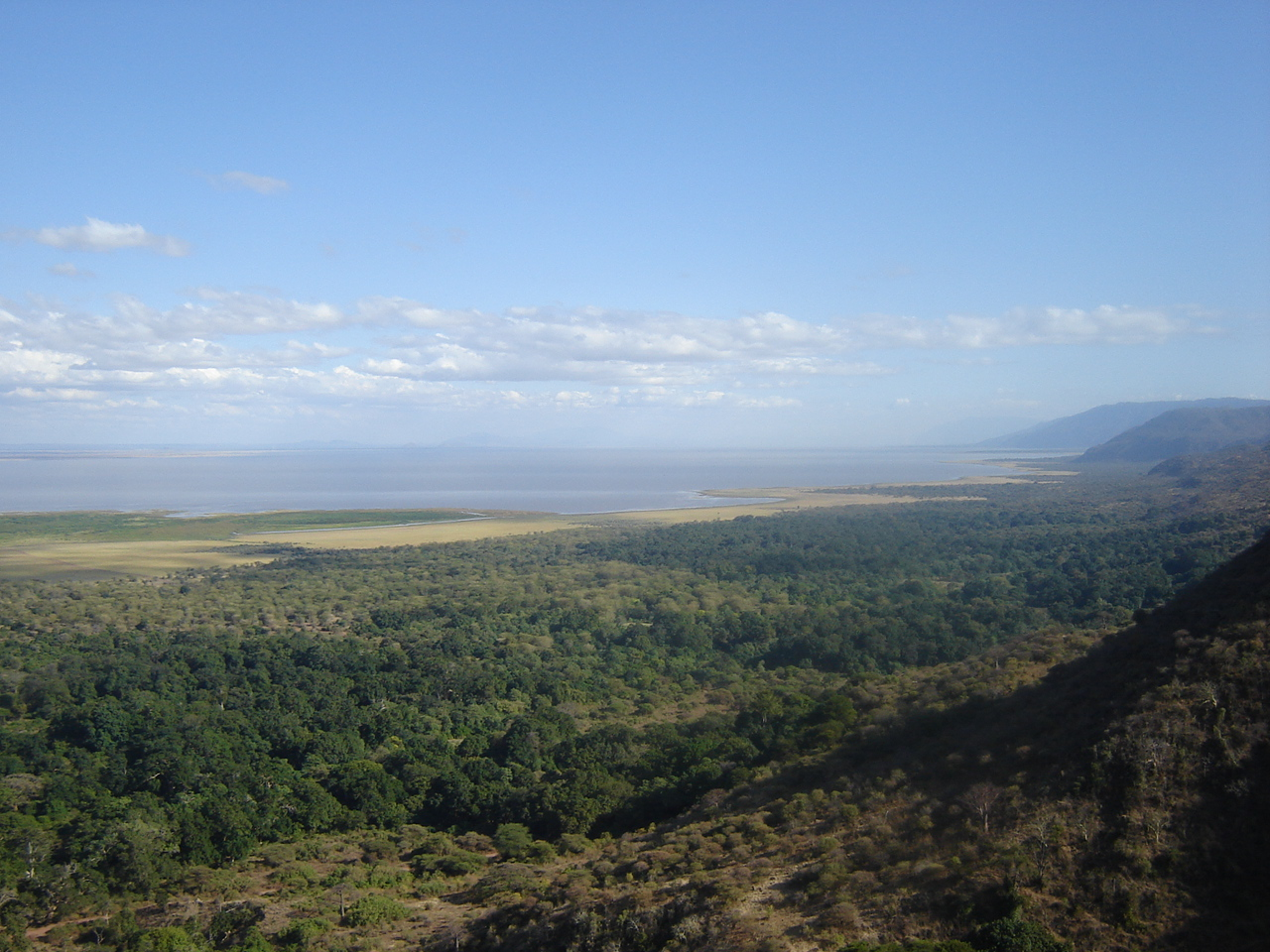
- Overlook of Lake Manyara National Park.

- Location within Tanzania
- Location: Monduli District, Arusha Region, Tanzania
- Coordinates: 3°35′S 35°50′E
- Lake type: Saline, alkaline, endorheic
- Primary inflows: Simba River (from the north), Makayuni River (from the east)
- Max. length: 40 km (25 mi) max
- Max. width: 15 km (9.3 mi) max
- Surface area: 181.5 sq mi (470 km^{2})
- Max. depth: 3.7 m (12 ft)
- Surface elevation: 1,045 m (3,428 ft)

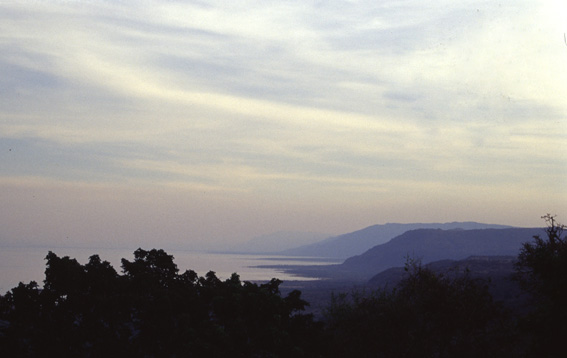
Lake Manyara, the cliff after the sunset.

Lake Manyara also known as Lake Moya among the Iraqw people is a lake located in Monduli District of Arusha Region, Tanzania and is the seventh-largest lake of Tanzania by surface area, at 470-square-kilometre (180 sq mi). It is a shallow, alkaline lake in the Natron-Manyara-Balangida branch of the East African Rift. The northwest quadrant of the lake (about 200 sq, km.) is included within Lake Manyara National Park and it is part of the Lake Manyara Biosphere Reserve, established in 1981 by UNESCO as part of its Man and the Biosphere Programme.

There are differing explanations for how Lake Manyara got its name. The name Manyara may come from the Maasai word "emanyara", which is the spiky, protective enclosure around a family homestead (boma). Possibly the 600 m high rift escarpment hems in the lake, like the enclosure around a Maasai boma. Another theory is that the Mbugwe tribe, who live in the Lake Manyara area, may have given the lake its name based on the Mbugwe word manyero, meaning a trough or place where animals drink water.

== Hydrology and basin ==
Lake Manyara has a catchment area of about 18,372 km^{2} with elevations between 938 m and 3633 m above sea level. The lake is in a closed basin with no outflow, wherein water is only lost by evaporation. It is fed by underground springs, but the vast majority of the inflow comes from rainwater fed permanent and ephemeral rivers that drain the surrounding catchment. The lake's depth and the area it covers fluctuates significantly. At its maximum, during the wet season, the lake is 40 km wide by 15 km with a maximum depth of 3.7 m. In 2010, a bathymetry survey showed the lake to have an average depth 0.81 m, and a maximum depth of about 1.18 m. In extreme dry periods the surface area of the lake shrinks as the waters evaporate and at times the lake has dried up completely. Lake Manyara is a soda or alkaline lake with a pH near 9.5, and it is also high in dissolved salts. The water becomes increasingly brackish in the dry season as water evaporates and salts accumulate. During dry spells, large areas of mud flats become exposed along the shore. These alkaline flats sprout into grasslands, attracting grazing animals, including large herds of buffalo, wildebeest and zebra. The Western side of the lake is flanked by a steep rift escarpment, to the North are the Ngorongoro highlands, while in the East and Southeast an undulating plain with isolated volcanic mountains gives way to a peneplain. Several springs, streams, wetlands and smaller lakes, both perennial and seasonal, drain into the lake. The shores of the saline lake host at its Northern tip the town of Mto wa Mbu with its irrigation agriculture. On its Western side there is a groundwater forest extending between the lake shore and the rift escarpment and covered mostly by the National Park until the Marang' forest. In the rift valley South of the lake vast river floodplains are used for irrigation agriculture. The wetter and more productive uplands all over the catchment are mostly used for rain-fed agriculture by various ethnicities depending on historical migration and resettlement patterns. The drier and more unpredictable savannas are used for livestock grazing by pastoralists (mainly Maasai). Southeast of LM another large and famous national park (Tarangire) is located. Furthermore, all over the catchment there are numerous game reserves, conservation areas, forest reserves, wildlife management areas and numerous villages and touristic infrastructures (roads, lodges and tented camps).

== Threats and protection ==
Lake Manyara is partly protected within the Lake Manyara National Park and is one of the seven Tanzanian, UNESCO Man and Biosphere reserves. The wider Lake Manyara basin social-ecological system suffers from multiple environmental problems due to unsustainable land and water use. Lake Manyara has experienced an overall upward trajectory in sedimentation rates over the last 120 years with distinct peaks in the 1960s and in 2010. The increased sedimentation rates are largely a result of a complex interaction between increased upstream soil erosion following land cover changes and natural rainfall fluctuations.

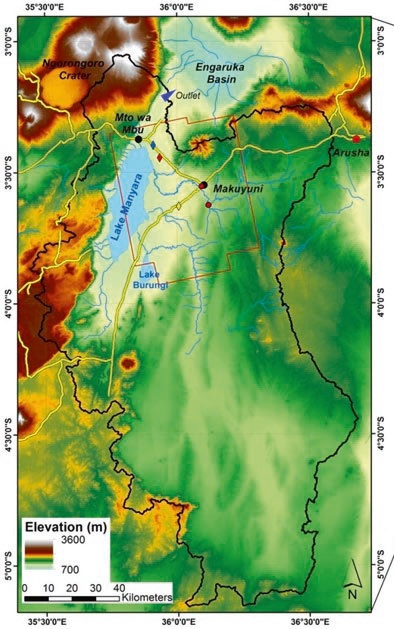
Map of the Manyara hydrological basin (solid black line) (adapted from Bachofer et al. 2014)

== Fish ==
The main fish species inhabiting the lake are catfish and tilapia. There is a small fishery, but fish only tend to be found near the inflow areas, where salt concentrations are lower. Lake Manyara is the type locality for the endangered fish Oreochromis amphimelas, a species of in the cichlid family, endemic to Tanzania, found in Lake Manyara and a number of other saline lakes with closed basins. Exploitation is prohibited in the parts of Lake Manyara within the National Park and the protected park areas provide important seed stock for the replenishment of fished populations.

== Birds ==
Lake Manyara National Park is known for flocks of thousands flamingos that feed along the edge of the lake in the wet season. At times, there have been over an estimated 2 million individuals of various species of water birds. The following table summarizes the most numerous species, according to the Important Bird Areas factsheet: Lake Manyara.

Species	Current IUCN Red List Category	Season	Year(s) of estimate	Population estimate
Northern Shoveler (Spatula clypeata)	LC	winter	1995	4,650 individuals
Greater Flamingo (Phoenicopterus roseus)	ELC	non-breeding	-	40,000 individuals
Lesser Flamingo (Phoeniconaias minor)	NT	non-breeding	1991	1,900,000 individuals
Yellow-billed Stork (Mycteria ibis)	LC	non-breeding	1995	1,020 individuals
Great White Pelican (Pelecanus onocrotalus)	LC	non-breeding	1991	200,000 individuals
Black-winged stilt (Himantopus himantopus)	NR	non-breeding	1995	8,367 individuals
Pied Avocet (Recurvirostra avosetta)	LC	non-breeding	1995	4,940 individuals
Chestnut-banded Plover (Charadrius pallidus)	NT	non-breeding	1995	619 individuals
Caspian Plover (Charadrius asiaticus)	LC	winter	1995	3,302 individuals
Ruff (Calidris pugnax)	LC	winter	1995	45,486 individuals
Little Stint (Calidris minuta)	LC	winter	1995	78,675 individuals
Marsh Sandpiper (Tringa stagnatilis)	LC	winter	1995	2,441 individuals
Common Gull-billed Tern (Sterna nilotica)	NR	winter	1995	1,566 individuals
White-winged Tern (Chlidonias leucopterus)	LC	winter	1995	3,283 individuals
Species group - waterbirds	n/a	non-breeding	1991–1995	1,000,000–2,499,999 individuals

== Visiting Lake Manyara ==
Lake Manyara can be accessed through Lake Manyara National Park. With an entrance gate that doubles as an exit, the trail into the park is effectively a loop that can be traversed by jeep within a few hours. The trails goes through forests shrublands and marsh, before reaching the shore of the lake. The Rift Valley escarpment provides a spectacular backdrop.

From the nearby town of Mto wa Mbu, through the Cultural Tourism Programme, it is possible to organize a canoe trip on the lake, or a fishing trip to learn traditional fishing methods. Bicycle trips to the east shore of the lake can also be arranged.
