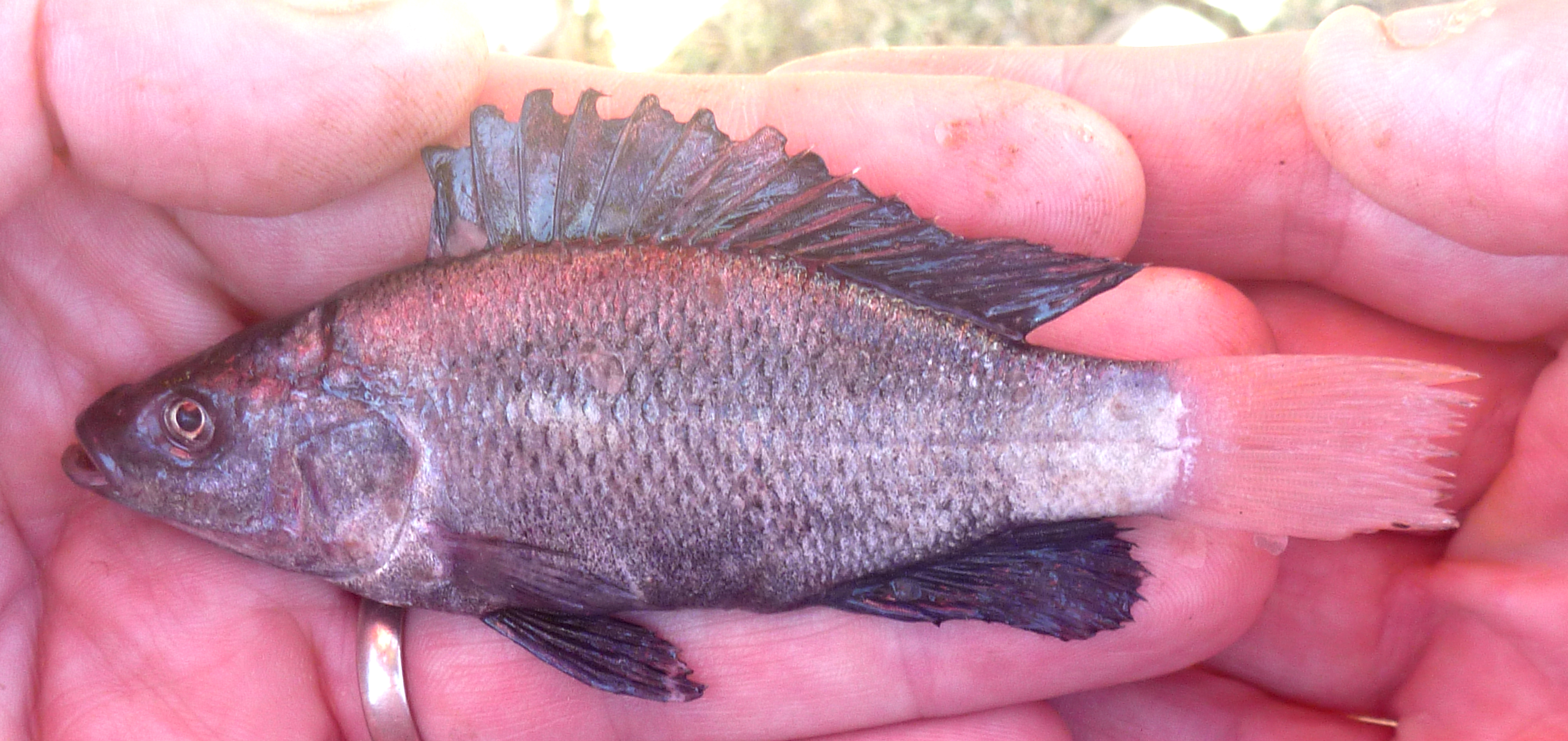
- Male Oreochromis amphimelas freshly collected from Lake Manyara in 2015

Conservation status
- Endangered (IUCN 3.1)

Scientific classification
- Kingdom: Animalia
- Phylum: Chordata
- Class: Actinopterygii
- Order: Cichliformes
- Family: Cichlidae
- Genus: Oreochromis
- Species: O. amphimelas

Binomial name
- Oreochromis amphimelas (Hilgendorf, 1905)

Synonyms
- Tilapia amphimelas Hilgendorf, 1905; Sarotherodon amphimelas (Hilgendorf, 1905); Tilapia manyarae Hilgendorf, 1905

= Oreochromis amphimelas =

Species of fish

Oreochromis amphimelas is a species of tilapia cichlid endemic to north–central Tanzania, where it is found in Lake Manyara and a number of other saline lakes with closed basins. Maximum recorded size is 28 cm (11 in) in standard length.

== Description ==
This is an unusual-looking tilapia: the front part of the head is very short, so it has a small eye, small mouth and short snout. The smaller fish have a rather cylindrical body, but the largest fish have a high, arched back and a concave head profile. The mouth is quite upwardly-angled. The gill arches hold relatively few gill rakers: only 12–16 on the lower part of the outermost arch, the arches lack microbranchiospines and the number of dorsal fin spines is only 12–14, which is rather low compared to other Oreochromis. Females and immatures are a silvery grey, but show little sign of vertical bars on the flanks or a 'tilapia mark' at the base of the soft dorsal fin shown by most other tilapias. Mature males are dark pinkish with black heads, bellies, and conspicuously black dorsal, anal and pelvic fins.

== Taxonomy and systematics ==
The species was described as Tilapia amphimelas by Franz Martin Hilgendorf at the Natural History Museum, Berlin in 1905 from male specimens collected from Lake Manyara by Oscar Neumann between 1893 and 1895. The name, meaning 'double-black', probably refers to the dark upper and lower fins of the breeding male. In the same paper, females of the same species were described as Tilapia manyarae, a possibility considered by Hilgendorf. In the 1960s, it was suggested that this species was closely related to the highly specialised soda lake cichlids from Lakes Magadi and Natron, now regarded as members of the genus Alcolapia. In the 1980s, Ethelwynn Trewavas separated them into separate subgenera, creating the little-used subgenus Vallicola for O. amphimelas. Genetic evidence published in 2019 supported earlier theories, indicating that O. amphimelas (along with O. esculentus) is closer to Alcolapia than it is to other Oreochromis.

== Reproduction ==
The species is a maternal mouthbrooder, like all other known species of the genus Oreochromis. Eggs are about 2–2.5mm in diameter. In Lake Manyara maturity is reached at around 7–8 cm SL. Females appear to grow larger than males, which is unusual in Oreochromis and cichlids in general.

== Distribution ==
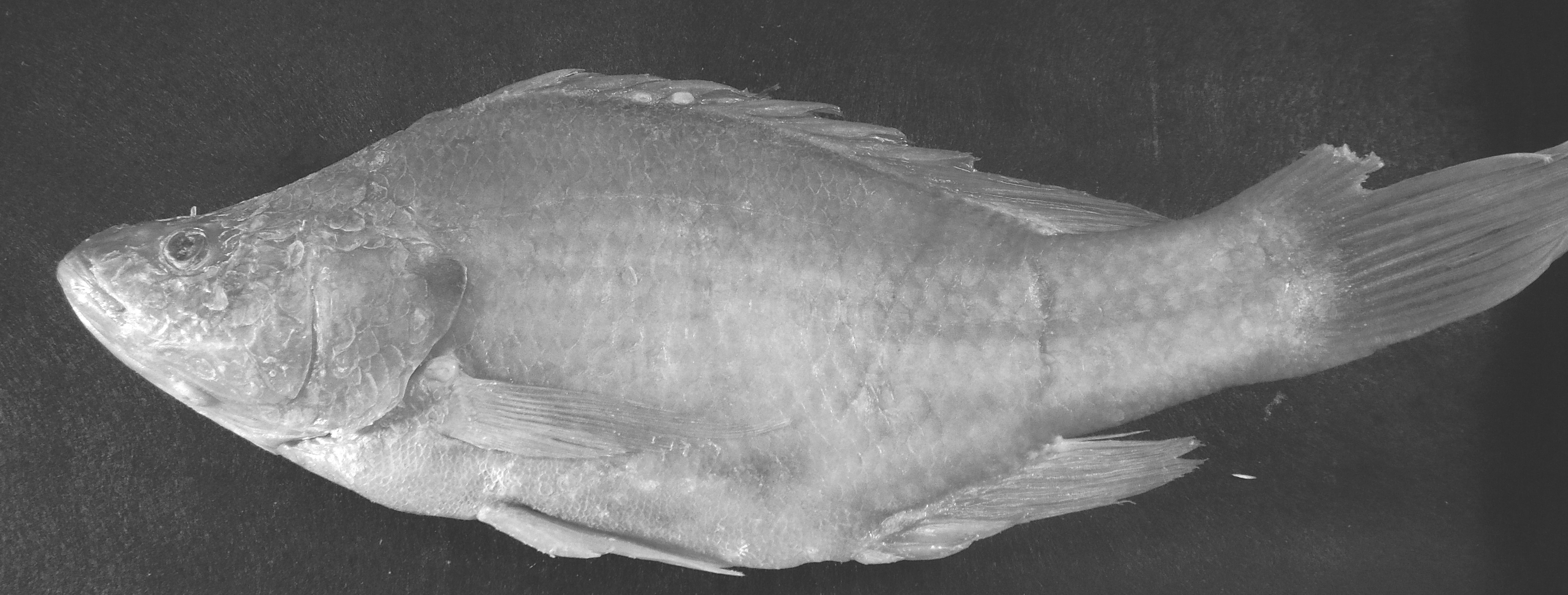
Large female specimen (265mm SL) of Oreochromis amphimelas from Lake Kitangiri, showing the characteristic arched back. From the Natural History Museum collection in London.

The type locality is Lake Manyara in northern Tanzania. This shallow lake is a closed basin, with inflowing streams but no outflow. The water level varies between seasons and years, leading to marked fluctuation in salinity and alkalinity. It has also been recorded from Lakes Eyasi, Kitangiri and Singida. These are also closed basins, but Kitangiri and Singida are generally less saline. Oreochromis amphimelas appears to attain much larger sizes (to 33 cm in total length) in these lakes, compared to the saltier Manyara and Eyasi (max 13 cm in total length). Recently, O. amphimelas has been reported from another closed saline lake, Lake Sulunga (or Sulungali), near Dodoma.

== Exploitation and conservation ==
The species is heavily fished where it is found. It is threatened by stocking of exotic tilapia species, including Oreochromis esculentus, Oreochromis niloticus, Oreochromis leucostictus and Coptodon spp., all which have been reported from catchments inhabited by O. amphimelas. Some of these species are believed to have hybridised with O. amphimelas.
