= Kitumbeine Volcano =

Volcano in Arusha Region of Tanzania

Kitumbeine
- Mlima Kitumbeine (Swahili)
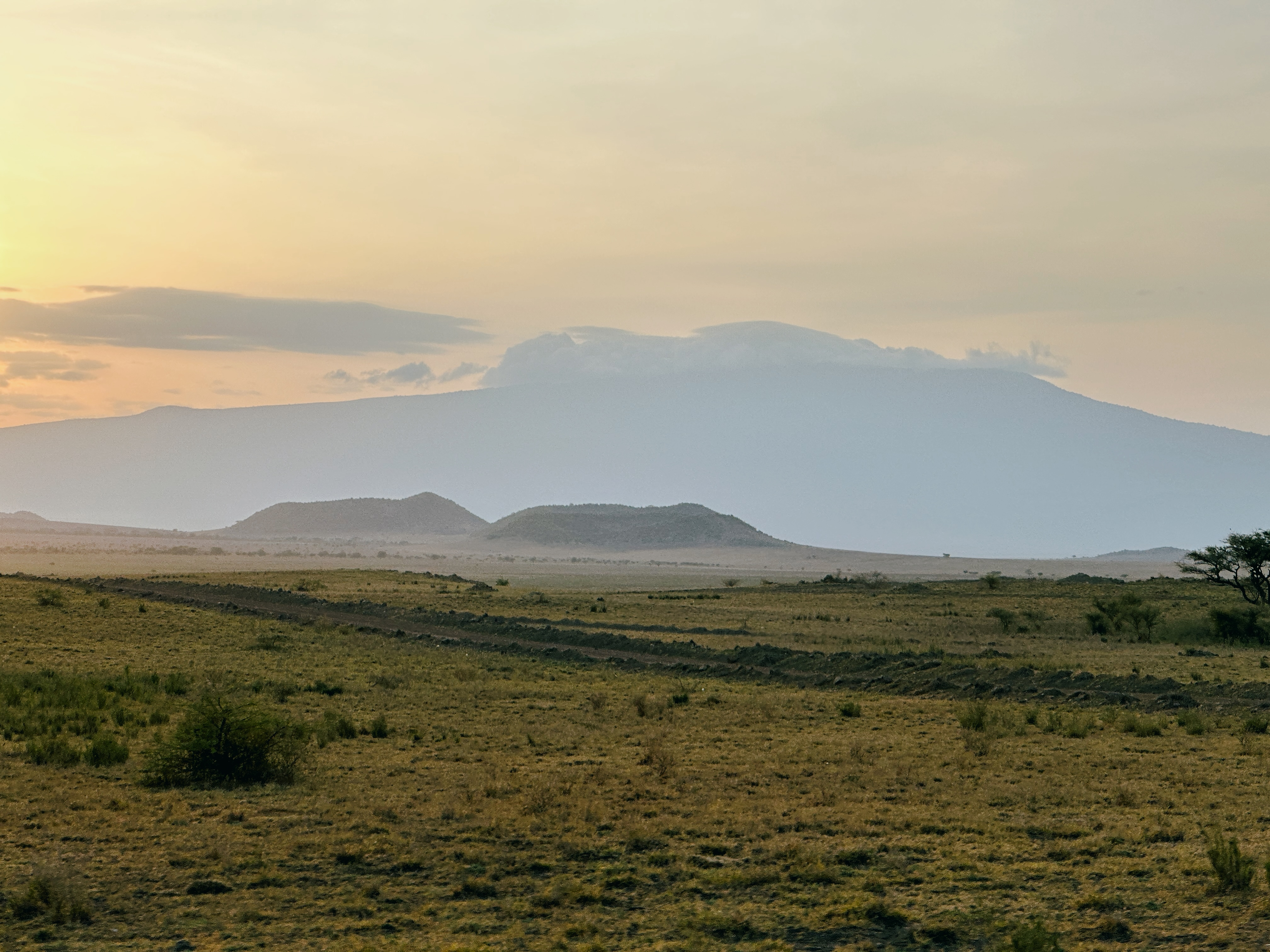
- Kitumbeine viewed from the north in Longido District

Highest point
- Elevation: 2,850 m (9,350 ft)
- Coordinates: 2°52′46.2″S 36°12′39.6″E

Geography
- Country: Tanzania
- Region: Arusha Region
- District: Longido District

Geology
- Formed by: Volcanism along the Gregory Rift
- Mountain type: Shield
- Volcanic zone: Crater Highlands
- Last eruption: Pleistocene

Climbing
- Access: Public

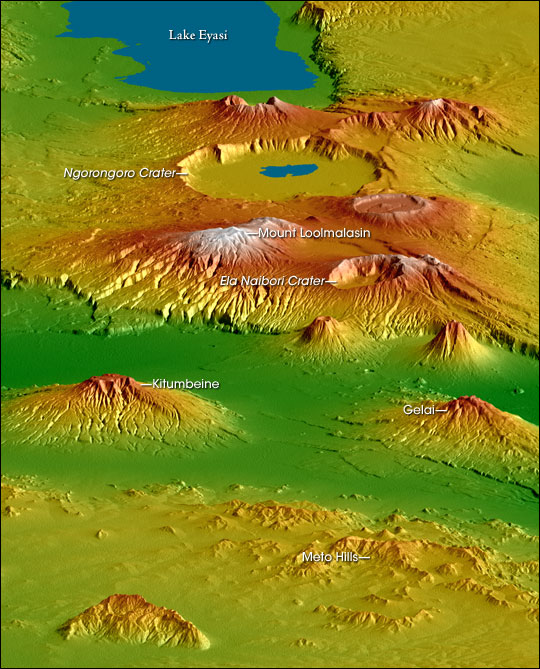
Topographical map of the Crater Highlands, looking from the north to the southwest. Kitumbeine is to the lower left

Kitumbeine Volcano also known as Kitumbeine (Swahili: Mlima Kitumbeine) at 2,850m is a shield volcano located in Longido District of Arusha Region in Tanzania. It stands at 2,850 metres (9,350 ft). The volcano is shared amongst three wards of Longido District, namely; Elang'ata Dapash, Kitumbeine and Iloirienito wards. The volcano is located in the geographic area known as the Crater Highlands and is a shield volcano that last erupted in the Pleistocene. Ketumbeine volcano activity continued throughout the Pleistocene.

The mountain is home to an endemic frog known as Strongylopus kitumbeine or the Kitumbeine Stream Frog, which belongs to the Pyxicephalidae family. The species inhabits Afromontane Juniperus forests and tussock grasslands at elevations ranging from 2,100–2,800 m (6,900–9,200 ft) above sea level along semi-permanent and seasonal streams and around temporary pools. It can also survive in poorly disturbed forest. Breeding occurs in open water. While it is common within its restricted range, it has been classified as a vulnerable species due to threats from Maasai livestock grazing and fire, as well as its small range.

== See also ==
- List of Ultras of Africa
