= Terrat =

Ward in Simanjiro, Manyara, Tanzania

- Ward
- Kata ya Terrat
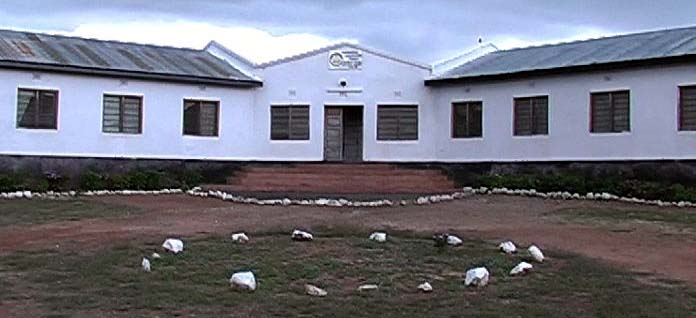
- Institute for Orkonerei Pastoralists Advancement-IOPA building in Terrat

- Location within Tanzania
- Coordinates: 03°29′22″S 36°40′49″E
- Country: Tanzania
- Region: Manyara Region
- District: Simanjiro

Population (2012)
  - Total: 8,586
- Time zone: UTC+3 (EAT)

Terrat is a ward and village in the Simanjiro district about 80 km from Arusha in Tanzania. The population in the area is Maasai who regularly gather in the village for its market where animals, cloths, kitchen utensils etc. are sold. The buildings in the village are one-storeyed, mostly cement walled with corrugated iron roofs, scattered at the banks of a small river. According to the 2012 census, the ward has a population of 8,586.

== Conservation ==
Terrat lies in the Simanjiro Plains, an important wet-season grazing area between Tarangire National Park and Mount Kilimanjaro. Expanding crop production has come in conflict with wildlife, leading to government restrictions on cultivation in the plains.

Terrat has been at the center of the Simanjiro Conservation Easement, a novel payment for ecosystem services scheme, since 2008. This contractual agreement between the village and a consortium of tourism vendors obligates villagers to forgo agricultural activities in some areas in return for annual cash payments of 5 million Tanzanian shillings (US$3000 or €2300 as of January 2013).

== Notable people ==
- James Ole Millya, former Longido District Commissioner.
- Martin Kariongi Ole Sanago, founder and former CEO of the Institute for Orkonerei Pastoralists Advancement-IOPA

== Development projects ==
The NGO Institute for Orkonerei Pastoralists Advancement-IOPA has a variety of activities in the village. One project is an FM radio station Orkonerei FM Radio Service, broadcasting primarily in Maa and Swahili. The radio station went on air in 2003 and is partly funded by the Swedish International Development Cooperation Agency. In 2009 the group began building a Jatropha-fired electrical power plant in Terrat. The project was funded by the Netherlands.

== Economic activities ==
The main economic activities within village are livestock keeping, small scale farming and normal trading of goods and services. There are small retail shops, small restaurants, bars, welding workshops and carpentry workshops. There is also one petrol station serving the village and the ward situated along the Arusha to Kiteto road which passes through Terrat village.
