= Longido, Longido District =

Ward and district capital of the Longido District in the Arusha Region of Tanzania

Longido Kata na Mji wa Longido (Swahili)
- Ward of Longido District
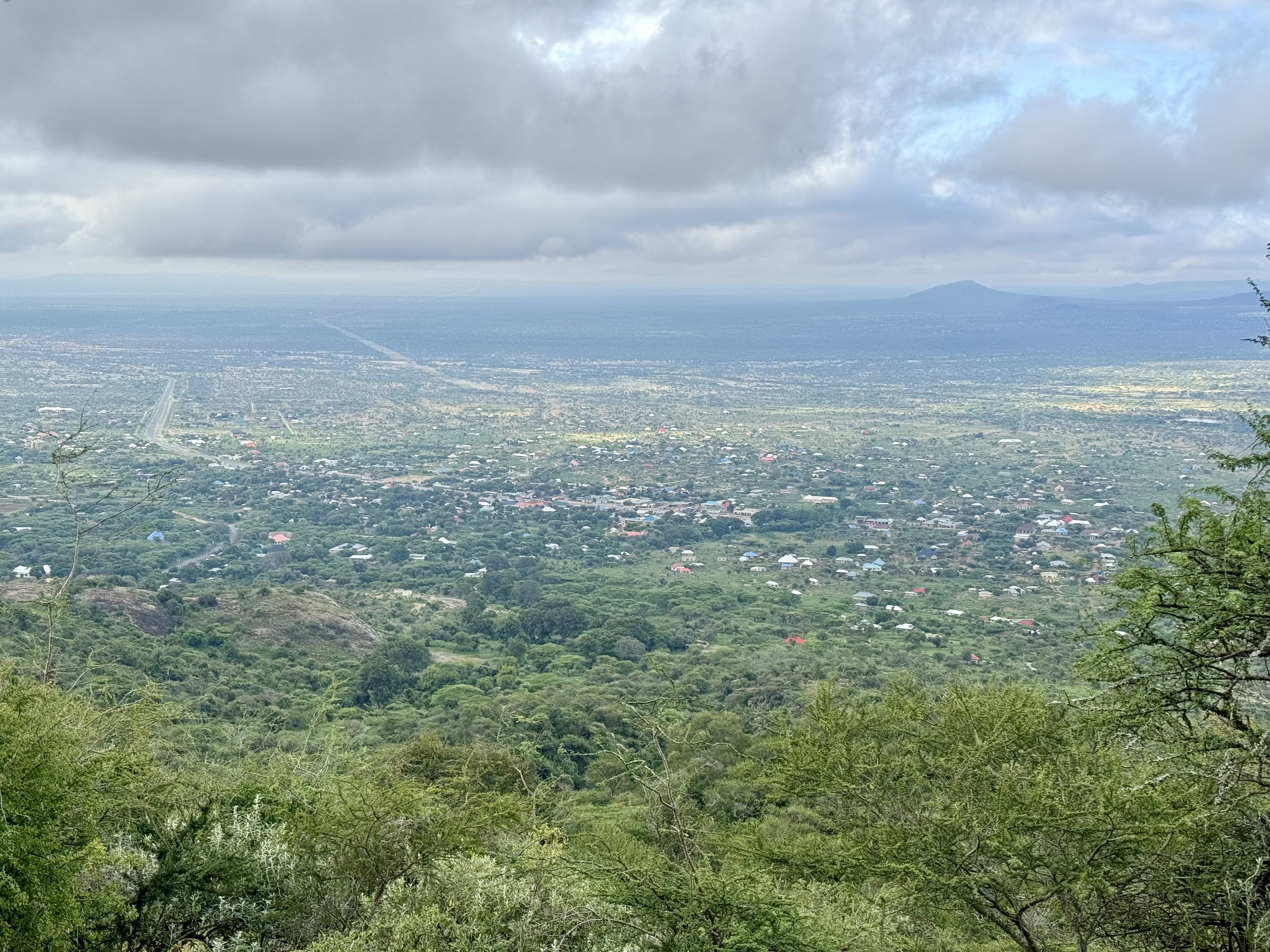
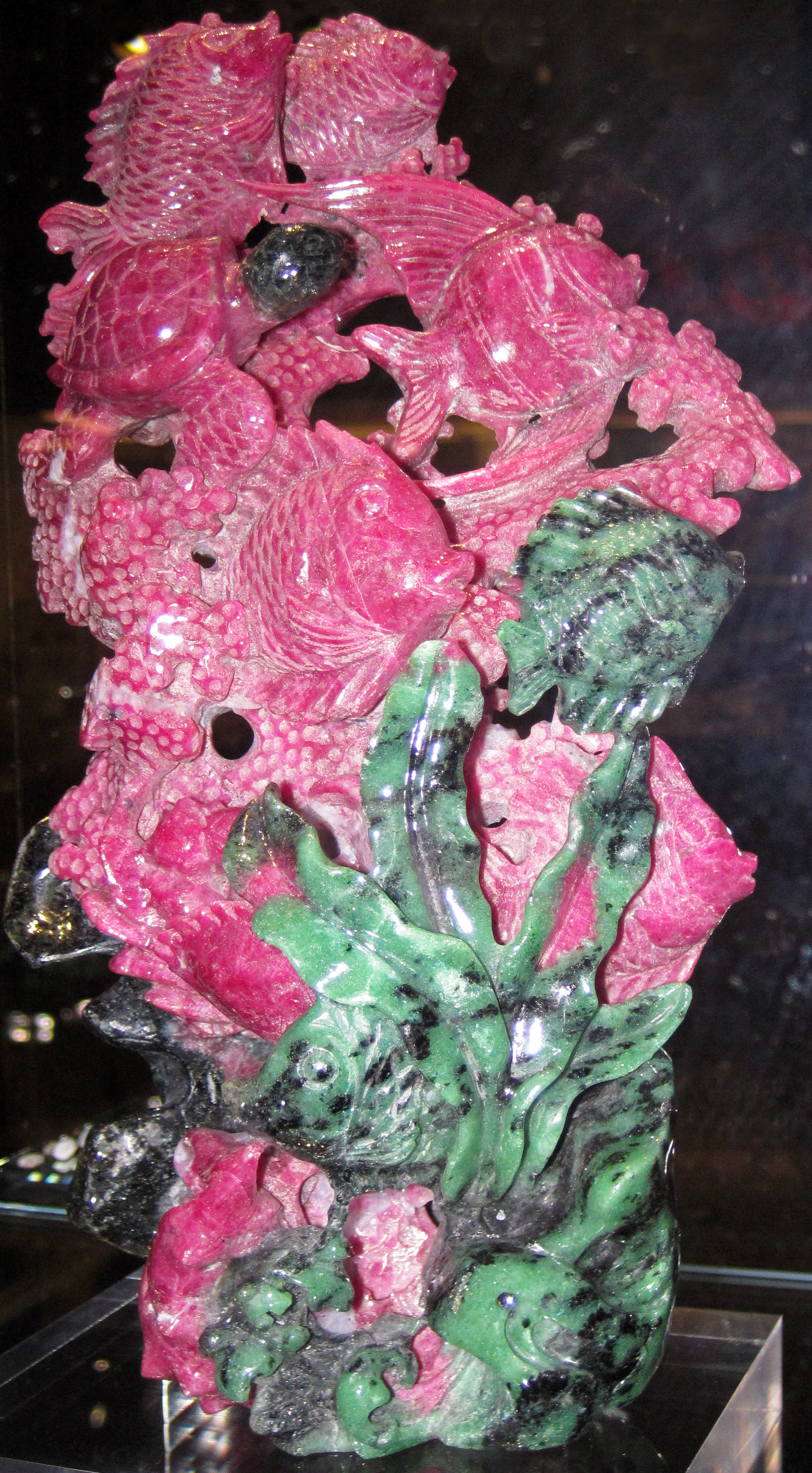
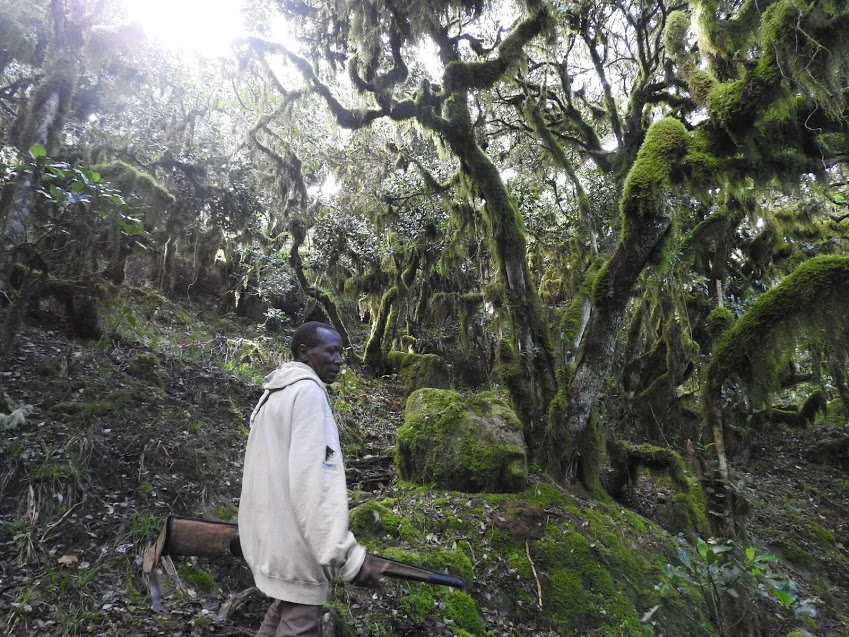
- From top to bottom: Scene at Longido town, Anyolite from Longido & Mount Longido Forest

- Location within Tanzania
- Coordinates: 2°43′57″S 36°41′54″E
- Country: Tanzania
- Region: Arusha Region
- District: Longido District
- Ward and District Capital: 2007
- Headquarters: Madukani

Area
  - Total: 22.41 km^{2} (8.65 sq mi)

Population (2012)
  - Total: 2,241
- Demonym: Longido Towner

Ethnic groups
  - Settler: Maasai
  - Ancestral: Rwa
- Tanzanian Postal Code: 23501

Longido or Longido Town (Kata na Mji wa Lingido in Swahili) is an administrative ward and district capital located in the Longido District of the Arusha Region of Tanzania. The ward is bordered to the south on three sides by Orbomba ward and to the north by Kimokouwa ward. It is the administrative seat for Longido District. According to the 2012 census, the ward has a total population of 2,241. Longido is at the foot of Mount Longido.

== History ==
On 3 November 1914, German forces defeated a British Expeditionary Force near Longido at the Battle of Kilimanjaro. A 1928 ascent of Mount Longido was described in Vivienne de Watteville's book Speak to the Earth (1935). Anyolite was first discovered at the Mundarara Mine near Longido in 1954.In 2007, Longido became the capital of Longido District, which was formed out of part of Monduli District.

== Administration ==
The postal code for Longido Ward is 23501. The ward is divided into the following neighborhoods (mitaa):

- Londigo
- Madukani
- Shuleni

=== Government ===
The ward, like every other ward in the country, has local government offices based on the population served. The Longido Ward administration building houses a court as per the Ward Tribunal Act of 1988, including other vital departments for the administration the ward. The ward has the following administration offices:

- Longido Ward Police Station
- Longido Ward Government Office (Afisa Mtendaji, Kata ya Longido)
- Longido Ward Tribunal (Baraza La Kata) is a Department inside Ward Government Office

In the local government system of Tanzania, the ward is the smallest democratic unit. Each ward is composed of a committee of eight elected council members which include a chairperson, one salaried officer (with no voting rights), and an executive officer. One-third of seats are reserved for women councillors.

== Education and health ==
=== Education ===
The home to these educational institutions:

- Longido Secondary School
- Longido Modern Primary School
- Oltepes Primary School

=== Healthcare ===
The ward is home to the following health institutions:

- Longido Health Center
