= Matale (disambiguation) =

Matale is a town in central Sri Lanka in Matale District, Central Province.

Matale may also refer to:

- Matale District, an administrative district of Sri Lanka
- Matale Electoral District, a multi-member electoral district of Sri Lanka
- Matale Electoral District (1947–1989), a former single-member electoral district of Sri Lanka
- Matale rebellion, a rebellion against the British colonial government in 1848
- Matale (Tanzanian ward), an administrative ward in the Monduli district of the Arusha Region of Tanzania
