= Mundarara =

Ward in Longido District, Arusha Region

Mundarara Ward Kata ya Mundarara (Swahili)}
- Ward
- Kata ya Mundarara
- Location within Tanzania
- Country: Tanzania
- Region: Arusha Region
- District: Longido District

Area
  - Total: 614.4 km^{2} (237.2 sq mi)
- Elevation: 1,458 m (4,783 ft)

Population (2012)
  - Total: 7,301
  - Density: 11.88/km^{2} (30.78/sq mi)

Mundarara is an administrative ward in the Longido District of the Arusha Region of Tanzania. The ward covers an area of 614.4 km^{2} (237.2 sq mi), and has an average elevation of 1,458 m (4,783 ft). According to the 2012 census, the ward has a total population of 7,301. the mineral Anyolite was first discovered there.
