= Strongylopus kitumbeine =

Conservation status
- Vulnerable (IUCN 3.1)

Scientific classification
- Kingdom: Animalia
- Phylum: Chordata
- Class: Amphibia
- Order: Anura
- Family: Pyxicephalidae
- Genus: Strongylopus
- Species: S. kitumbeine

Binomial name
- Strongylopus kitumbeine Channing and Davenport, 2002

Species of amphibian

Strongylopus kitumbeine (common name: Kitumbeine stream frog) is a species of frogs in the family Pyxicephalidae. It is endemic to Longido District of Arusha Region of Tanzania and only known from its type locality, Kitumbeine Volcano.

The species lives at elevations of 2,100–2,800 m (6,900–9,200 ft) above sea level along semi-permanent and seasonal streams and around temporary pools in montane Juniperus forests and tussock grasslands. It survives also in heavily disturbed forest. Breeding takes place in open water. While it is common within its small range, it has been assessed as being "Vulnerable" because of threats from livestock grazing and fire in combination with the small range.
