= Tingatinga =

Tingatinga may refer to:

- Tingatinga (painting), an east-African painting genre
  - Edward Saidi Tingatinga, founder of the genre
  - Tingatinga Arts Cooperative Society (formerly "Tingatinga Society"), an art school founded by E.S. Tingatinga to promote the painting genre
- Tingatinga (Tanzanian ward)
- Tinga Tinga Tales, a television cartoon series about animals
