= Simanjiro Conservation Easement =

- Location within Tanzania
- Location: Simanjiro District
- Nearest city: Terrat
- Coordinates: 3°52′S 36°36′E
- Established: 2005

The Simanjiro Conservation Easement is a novel payment for ecosystem services scheme in the Simanjiro Plains of Tanzania, an important wet-season grazing area between Tarangire National Park and Mount Kilimanjaro. This contractual agreement between individual villages and a consortium of tourism vendors obligates local residents to forgo agricultural activities in some areas in return for annual cash payments of 5 million Tanzanian shillings (US$3000 or €2300 as of January 2013) per village.

It is significant because it is among the first payment for ecosystem services (PES) projects to exclude the involvement of government conservation agencies.

Expanding crop production had come in conflict with wildlife for some time, leading the regional government to try to restrict cultivation in the plains.

The scheme started with Terrat in 2004 and 2005. The village of Sukuro joined later.
