= Gelai Lumbwa =

Ward in Arusha Region, Tanzania

- Ward
- Location within Tanzania
- Coordinates: 02°32′16″S 36°11′19″E
- Country: Tanzania
- Region: Arusha Region
- District: Longido District

Population (2012)
  - Total: 6,198

Gelai Lumbwa is an administrative ward in the Longido District of the Arusha Region of Tanzania. According to the 2012 census, the ward has a total population of 6,198.
