= Mount Longido =

Mountain in Arusha Region, Tanzania

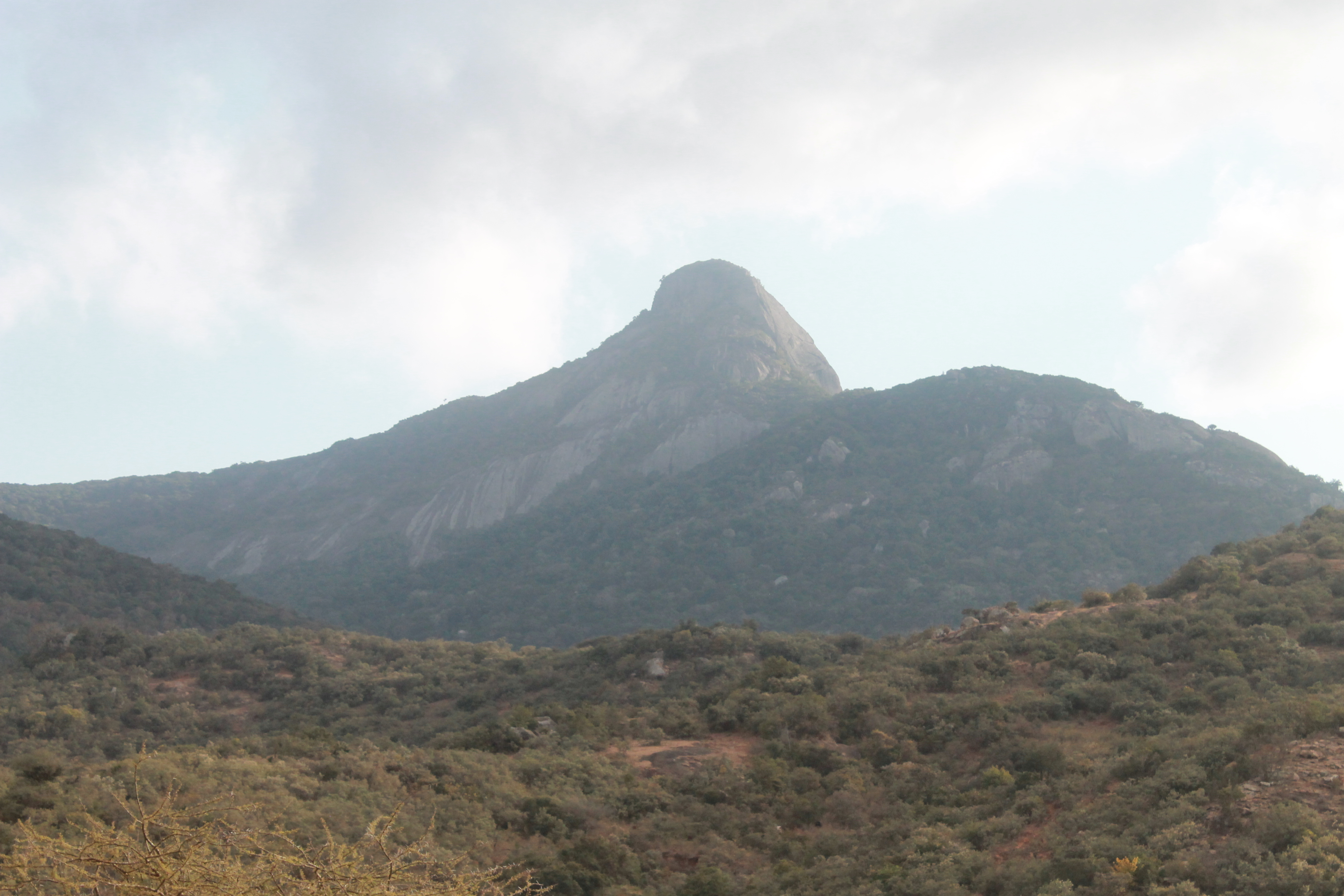

Highest point
- Elevation: 2,637 m (8,652 ft)
- Prominence: 1,250 m (4,100 ft)
- Listing: Ribu
- Coordinates: 2°41′S 36°42′E

Geography
- Location within Tanzania
- Location: Arusha Region, Tanzania

Mount Longido is a mountain in located in Longido District of Arusha Region in Tanzania. The peak has an elevation of 2,637 m above sea level. Mount Longido is located in Longido District of Arusha Region.

The principal path to the summit starts in the town of Longido. The climb can be done in one day, but it is also common for climbers to spend one night in a tented camp on the mountain and reach the summit on the second day. Sometimes visitors climb Mount Longido as part of the preparations for the ascent of nearby Mount Kilimanjaro.

== See also ==
- List of Ultras of Africa
- Arusha Region

== Gallery ==
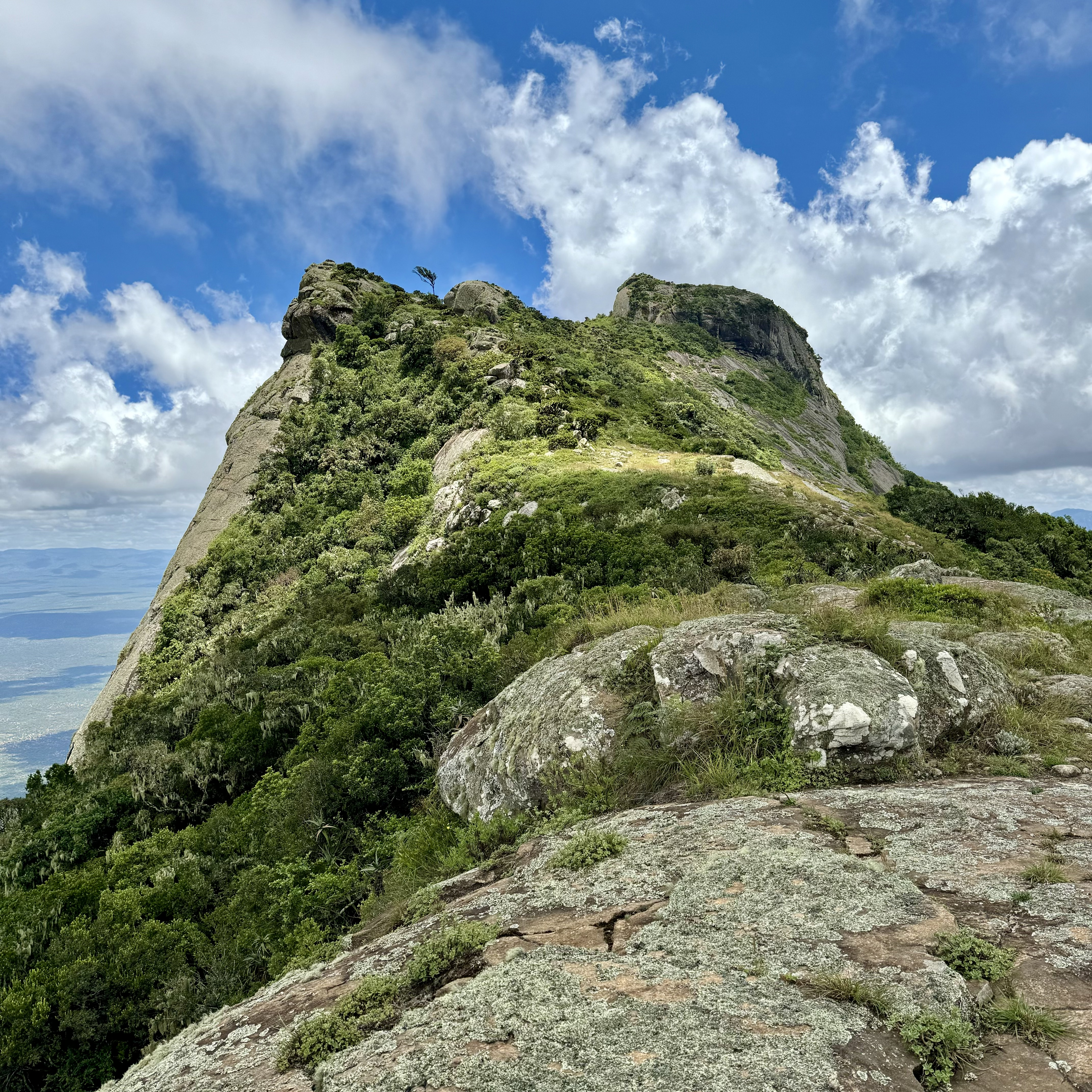
summit

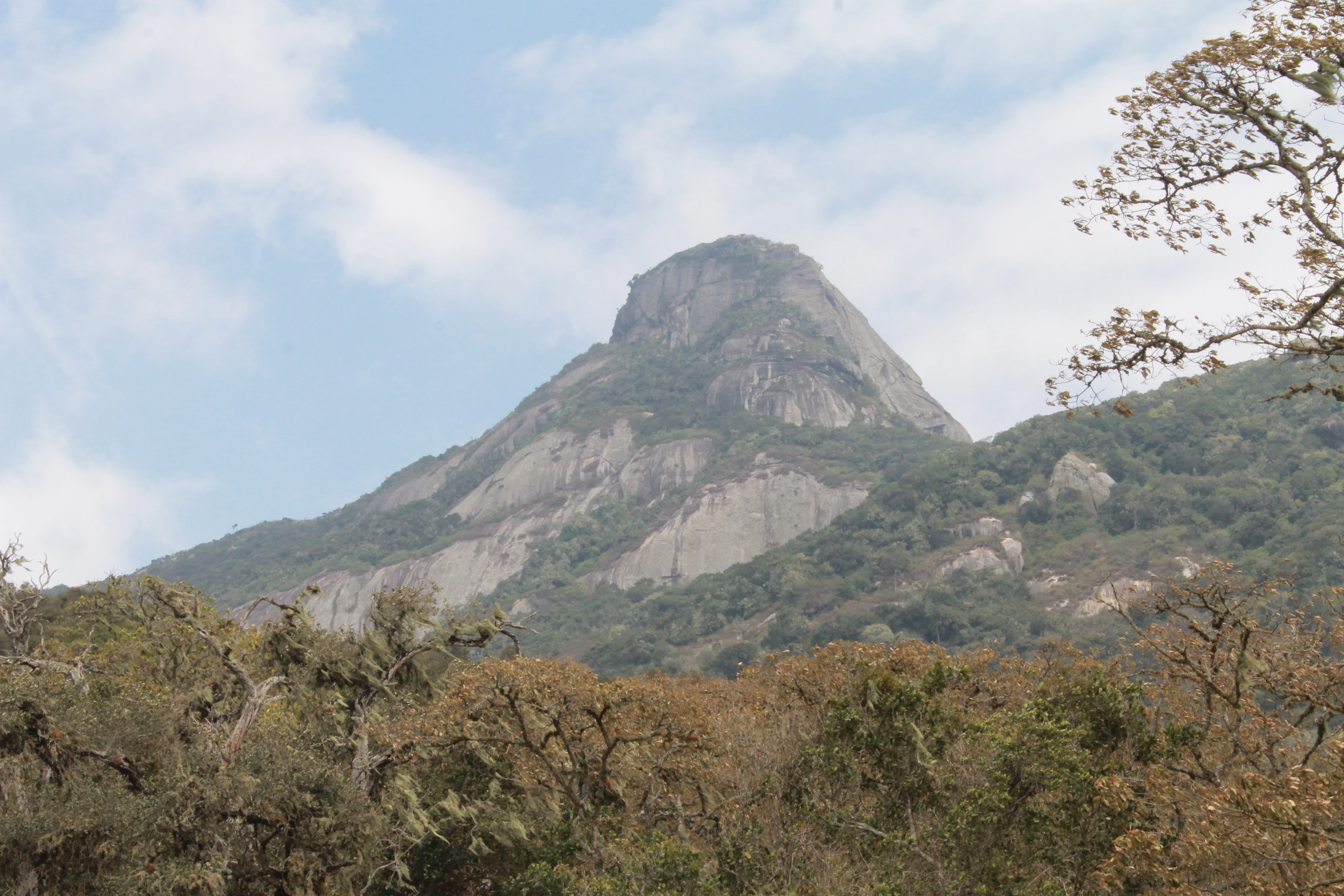
View of Summit

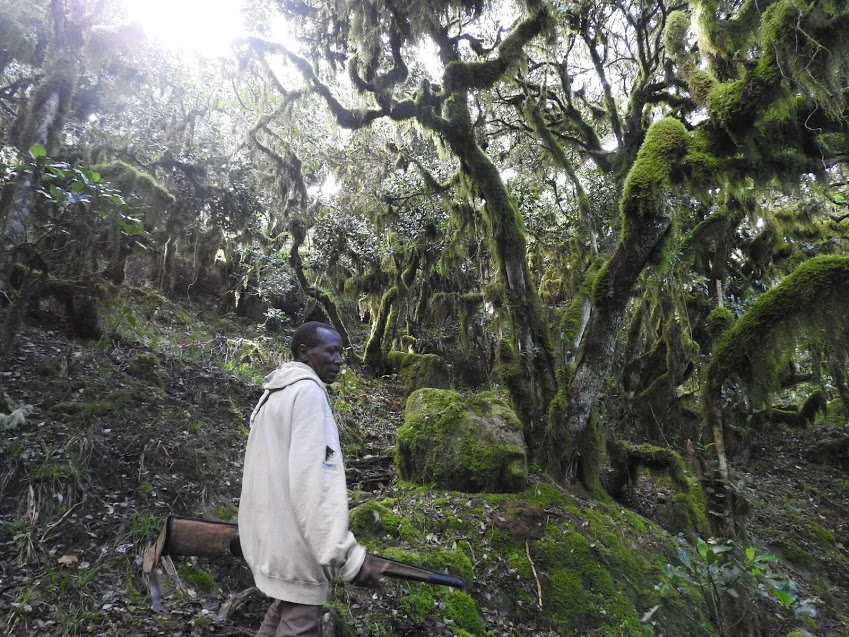
Forest guide

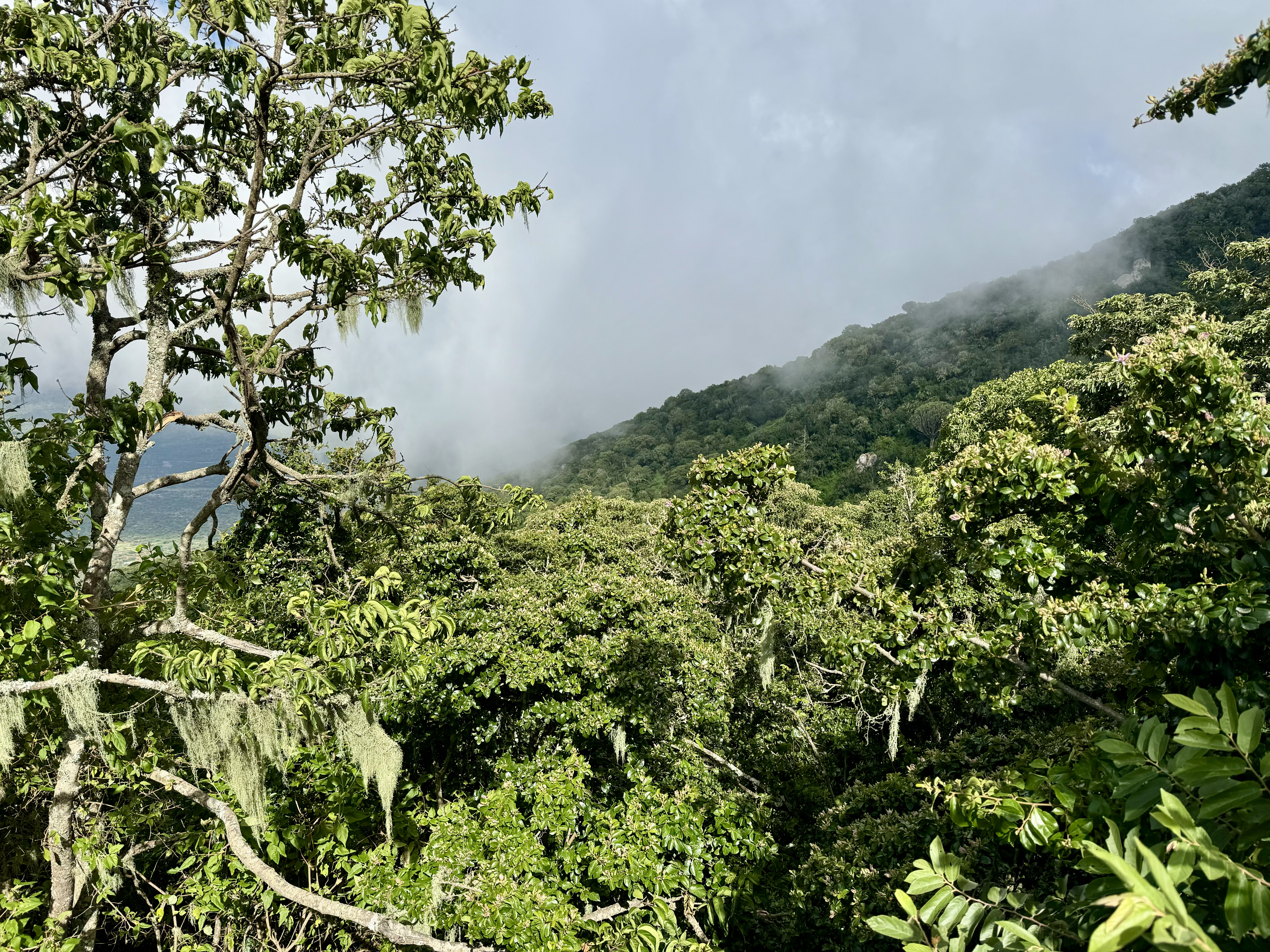

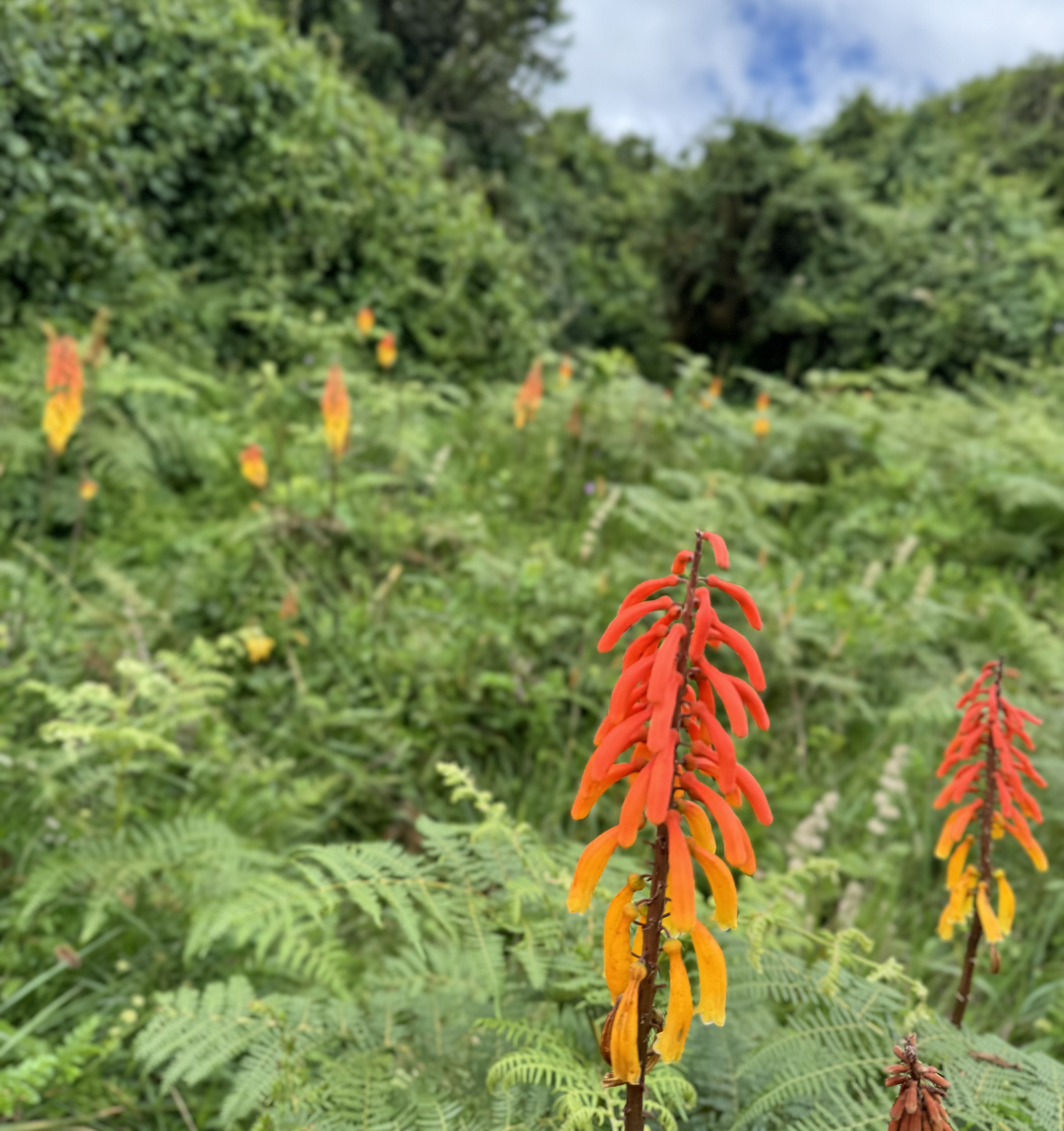
Flora

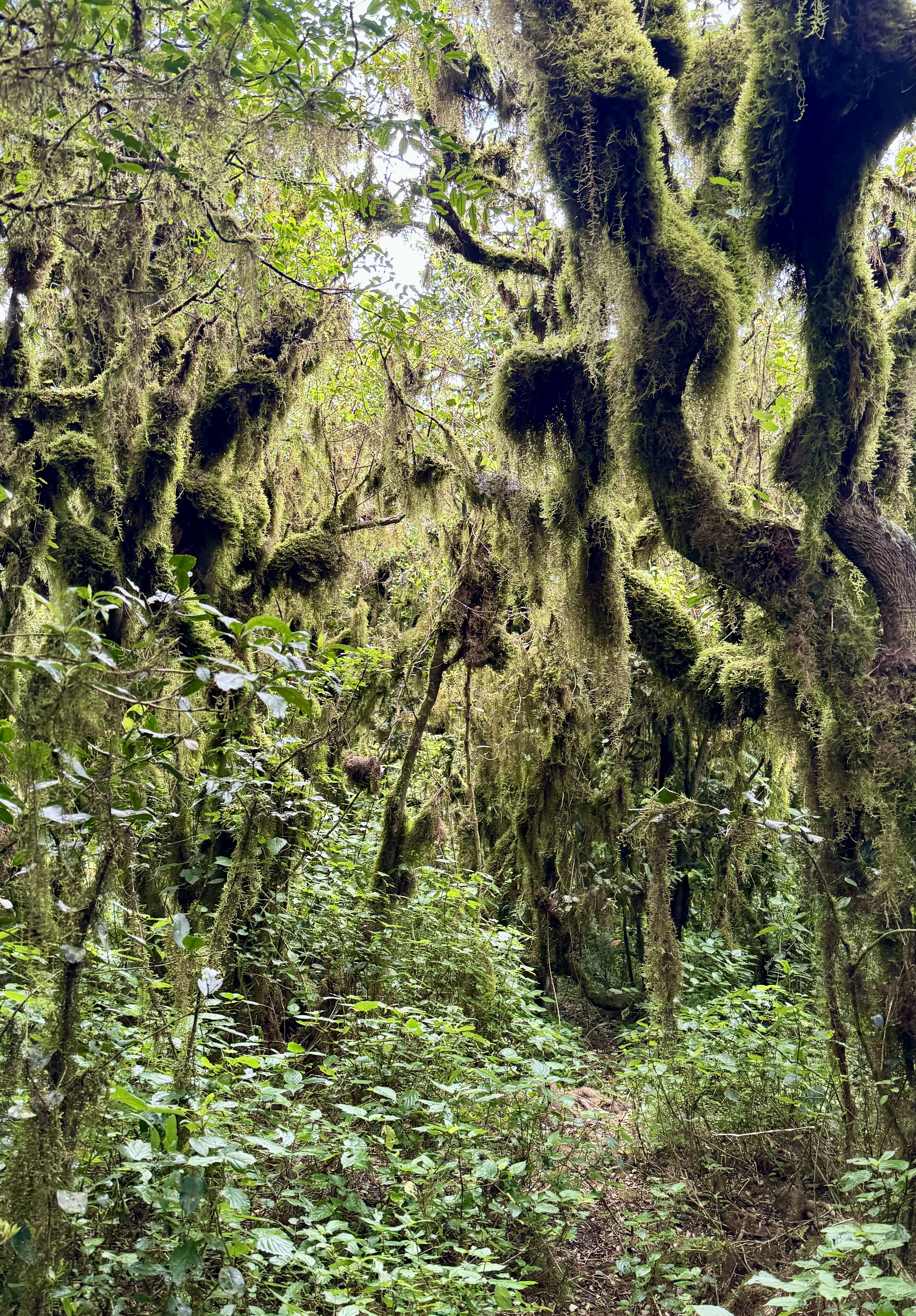
Moss

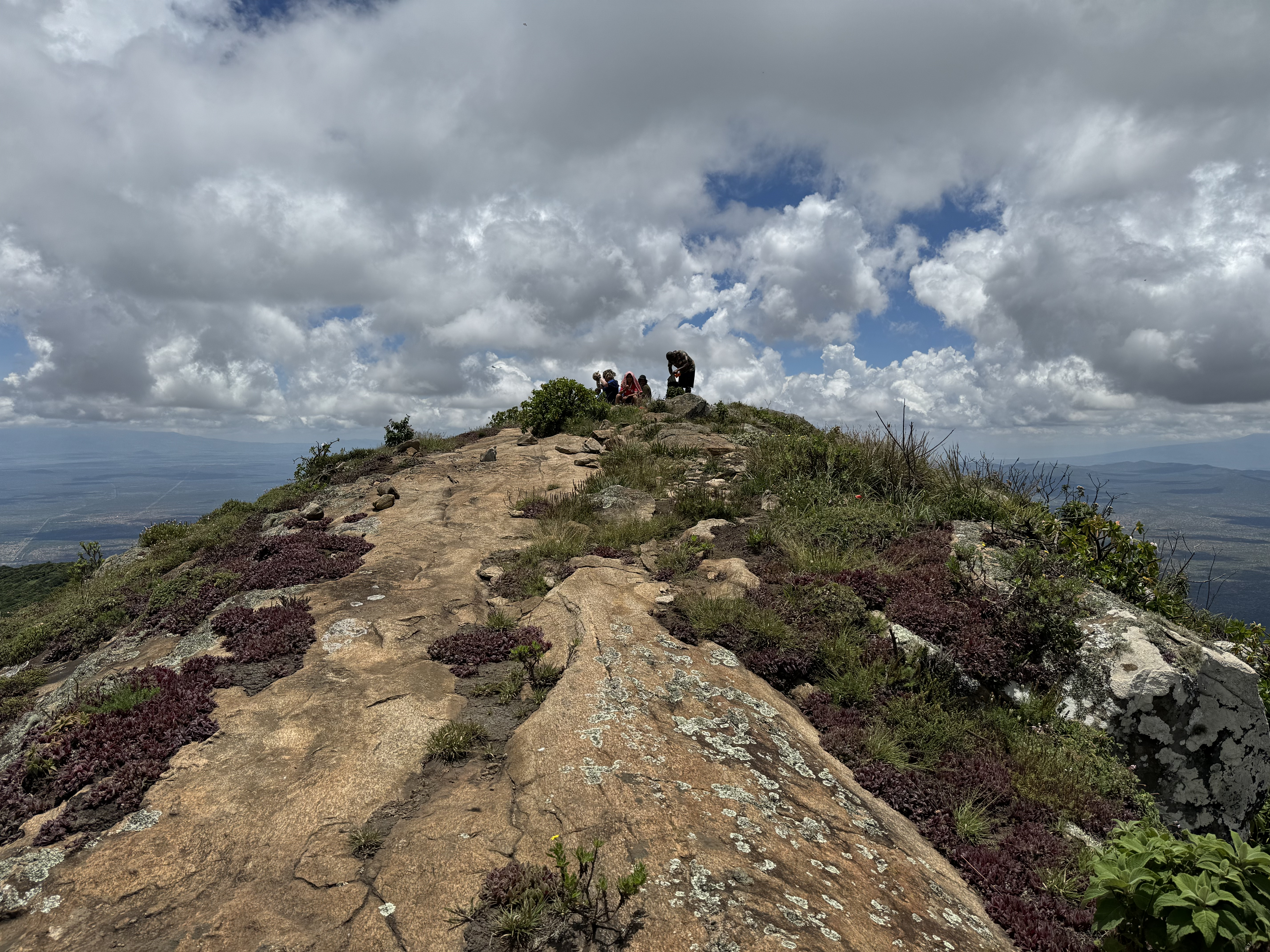
On top of Mt. Longido
