= Orkesumet =

Ward in Simanjiro, Manyara, Tanzania

- Town
- Location in Tanzania
- Coordinates: 04°27′44″S 37°12′17″E
- Country: Tanzania
- Region: Manyara Region
- District: Simanjiro District

Population (2012)
  - Total: 5,325
- Time zone: GMT + 3

Orkesumet is a town and a ward in the Manyara Region of Tanzania. It is the district headquarter of Simanjiro District.

According to the 2012 census, the population of Orkesumet is 5,325.

In 2014, plans were announced to build the Simanjiro District Hospital in Orkesumet.
