= Gelai Meirugoi =

Ward in Longido, Arusha, Tanzania

- Ward
- Location within Tanzania
- Coordinates: 02°42′57″S 36°02′31″E
- Country: Tanzania
- Region: Arusha Region
- District: Longido District

Population (2012)
  - Total: 9,173

Gelai Meirugoi is an administrative ward in the Longido District of the Arusha Region of Tanzania. According to the 2012 census, the ward has a total population of 9,173.
