= Pargasite =

Amphibole, double chain inosilicate mineral

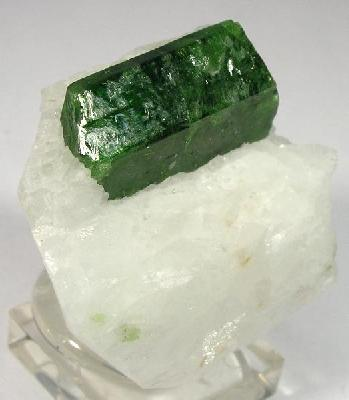
- Single crystal of pargasite, 1.5 cm long, on a matrix of white marble from Hunza Valley, Pakistan

General
- Category: Inosilicates
- Formula: NaCa_{2}(Mg_{4}Al)(Si_{6}Al_{2})O_{22}(OH)_{2}
- IMA symbol: Prg
- Strunz classification: 9.DE.15
- Dana classification: 66.1.3a.12
- Crystal system: Monoclinic
- Crystal class: Prismatic (2/m) (same H-M symbol)
- Space group: C2/m

Identification
- Color: Bluish green, grayish black, light brown
- Crystal habit: Stout prismatic to tabular
- Twinning: Simple and lamellar – common
- Cleavage: {110} perfect
- Fracture: Splintery
- Mohs scale hardness: 5–6
- Luster: Vitreous
- Diaphaneity: Translucent, will transmit light on thin edges.
- Specific gravity: 3.04–3.17
- Optical properties: Biaxial (−)
- Refractive index: nα = 1.630 nβ = 1.640 nγ = 1.650
- Birefringence: δ = 0.020 max.

Pargasite or pargasitic hornblende is a complex inosilicate mineral of the amphibole group with formula NaCa_{2}(Mg_{4}Al)(Si_{6}Al_{2})O_{22}(OH)_{2}.

It was first described for an occurrence in Pargas, Finland in 1814 and named for the locality.

It occurs in high temperature regional metamorphic rocks and in the skarns within contact aureoles around igneous intrusions. It also occurs in andesite volcanic rocks and altered ultramafic rocks.

Pargasite is the main water-storage site in the uppermost mantle; however, it becomes unstable at depths greater than 90 km (56 mi). This has significant consequences for the water storage capacity, and the solidus temperature of the lherzolite of the upper mantle.

It is used as a gemstone.

== See also ==
- Anyolite
