= Namanga (Tanzanian ward) =

Coordinates: 2°33′S 36°46′E

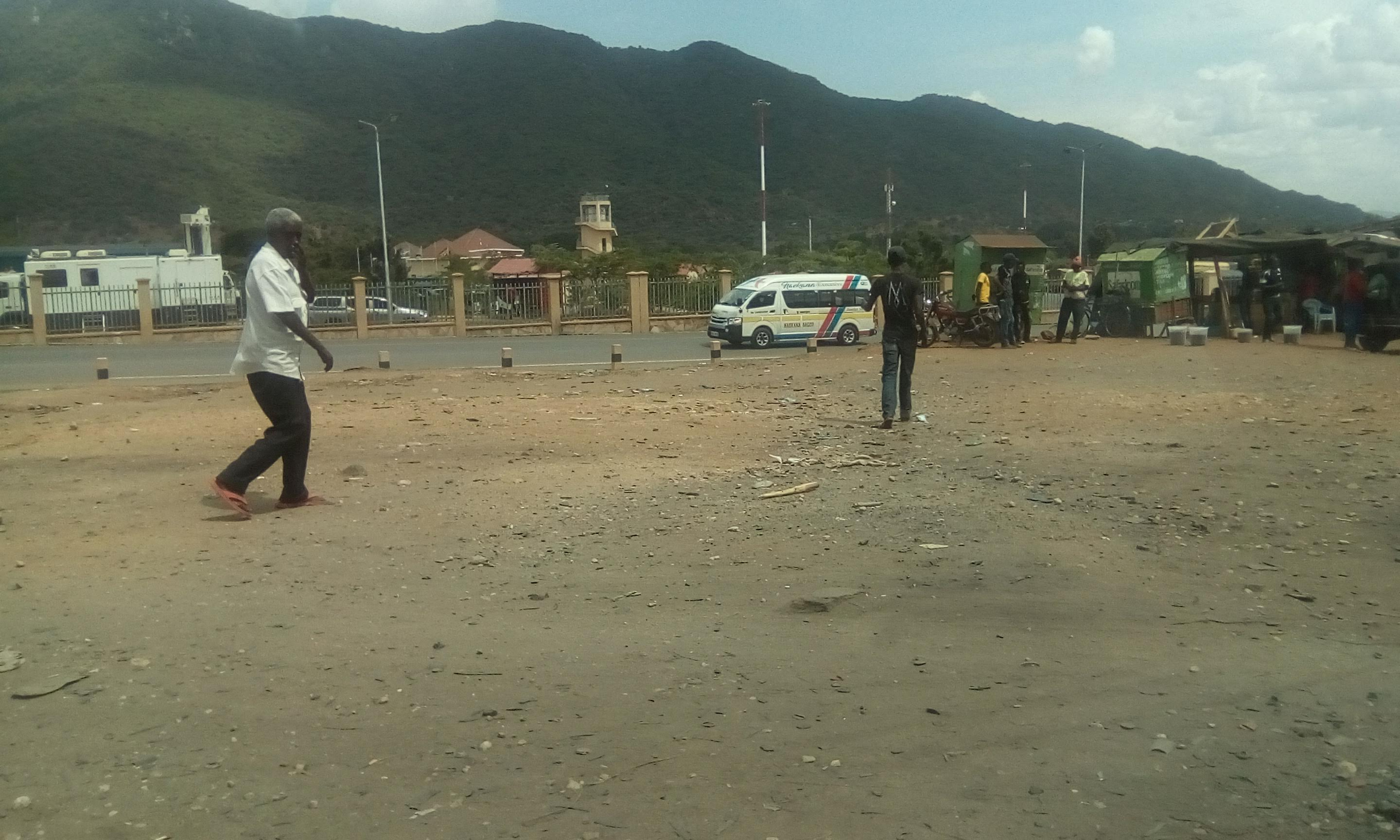
Namanga border on the side of Tanzania

Namanga is an administrative ward in the Longido District of the Arusha Region of Tanzania. According to the 2002 census, the ward has a total population of 10,904. Until 2007 it was part of Monduli District.
