= Gelai Volcano =

Volcano in Arusha Region of Tanzania

Gelai
- Mlima Gelai (Swahili)
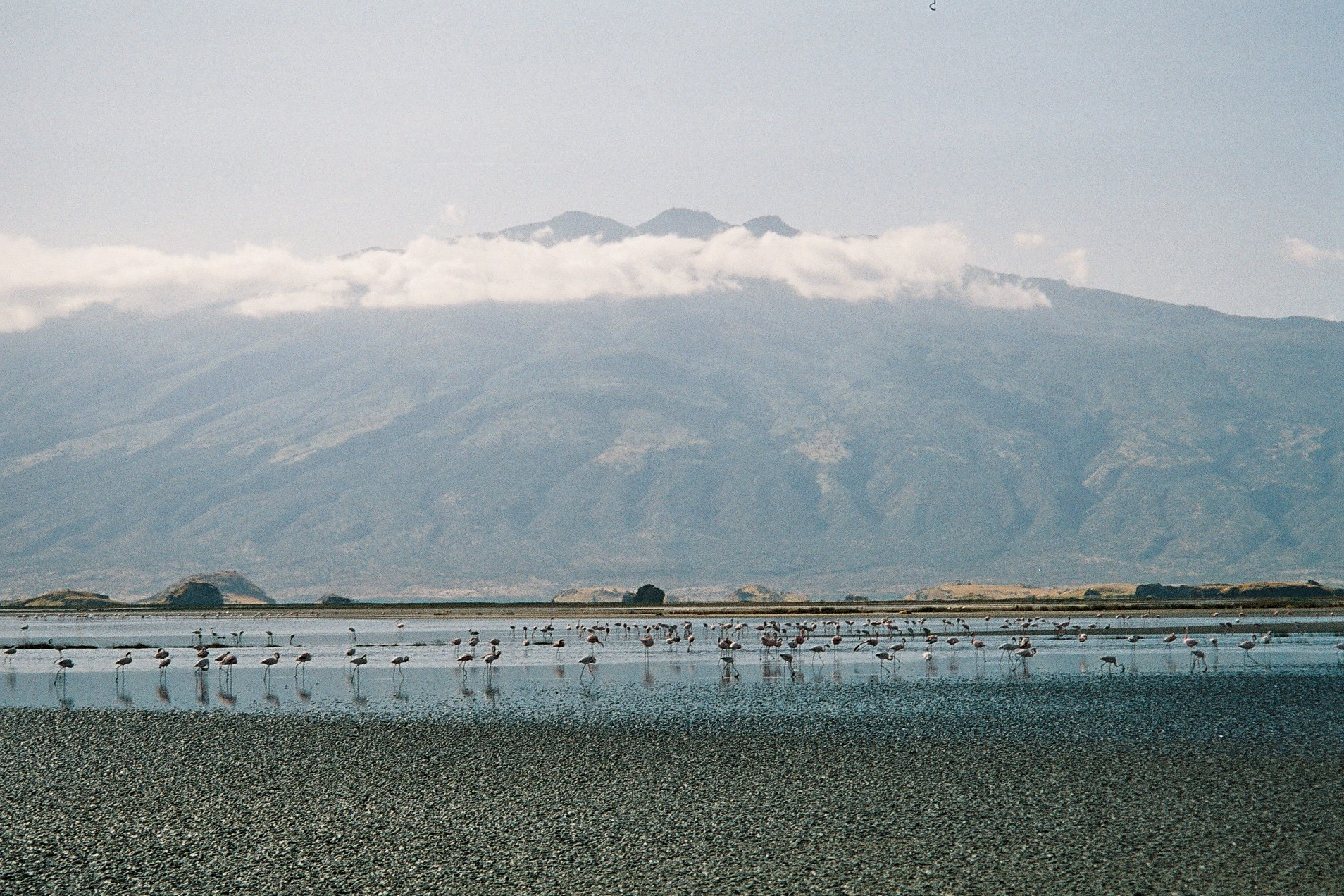
- Gelai viewed across Lake Natron

Highest point
- Elevation: 2,948 m (9,672 ft)
- Prominence: 1,925 m (6,316 ft)
- Listing: Ultra; Ribu
- Coordinates: 2°37′09″S 36°06′01″E

Geography
- Country: Tanzania
- Region: Arusha Region
- District: Longido District

Geology
- Formed by: Volcanism along the Gregory Rift
- Mountain type: Shield volcano
- Volcanic zone: Crater Highlands
- Last eruption: Pleistocene

Climbing
- Access: Public

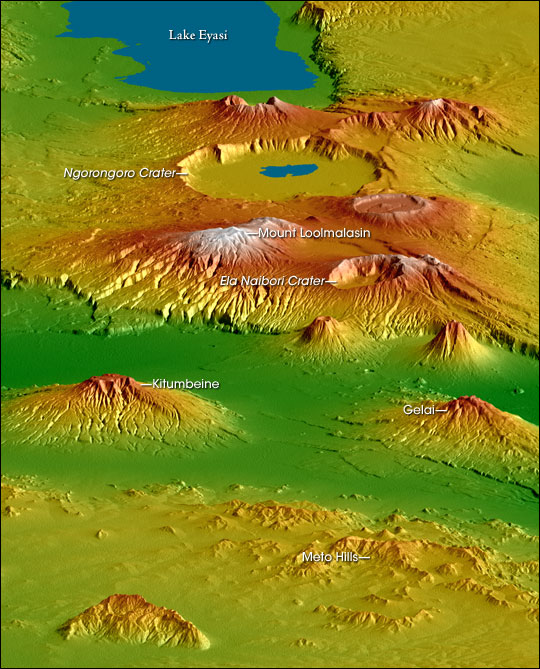
Topographical map of the Crater Highlands, looking from the north to the southwest. Gelai is to the lower right

Gelai Volcano also known as Gelai (Swahili: Mlima Gelai) stands at 2,948 metres (9,672 ft) tall and is located in Longido District of Arusha Region in Tanzania. The volcano is located in the geographic area of the Crater Highlands and is a shield volcano that last erupted in the pleistocene. It is at the southeastern edge of Lake Natron in the East African Rift. Gelai is the third most prominent peak in Arusha Region and is the 13th highest peak in Arusha region. Volcanic activity on Gelai dates to less than one million years ago. A number of earthquakes occurred in the area in the summer of 2007. Associated with the largest earthquake on 17 July, a NNE-oriented fracture or narrow graben formed on the southern flank of Gelai. The fracture may be associated with the intrusion of a narrow dike at a depth of around 4,000 metres (13,000 ft).

== Forest Reserve ==
Gelai Forest is a Local Government Reserve that was formed in 1955 and comprises around 2,341 acres of the isolated top of Gelai Hill, which has an elevation of 2,942 m. Locals have encroached on and settled on around 452.7 acres of forest.

Gelai Forest Reserve (GFR) is one of the most important dry montane forests for water catchment in Tanzania's Longido District. The location, which is located at 2°40' S, 36° 5' E on volcanic soil, receives 500–750 mm of annual rainfall with daily minimum and maximum temperatures of roughly 17 °C and 22 °C, respectively. The primary section of the forest is dominated by shrubs, herbs, and grass, with dry montane forest at higher altitudes, although with a closed canopy only in riverine areas.

Five settlements surround the forest: Alaililai, Lumbwa, Meirugoi, Magadini, and Loondolou Esirwa. The main socioeconomic activity in these Maasai settlements include livestock raising, agriculture, and tiny microbusinesses. However, human activities including as logging, charcoal burning, cattle grassing, and farming endanger the forest controlled by the Longido District Council.

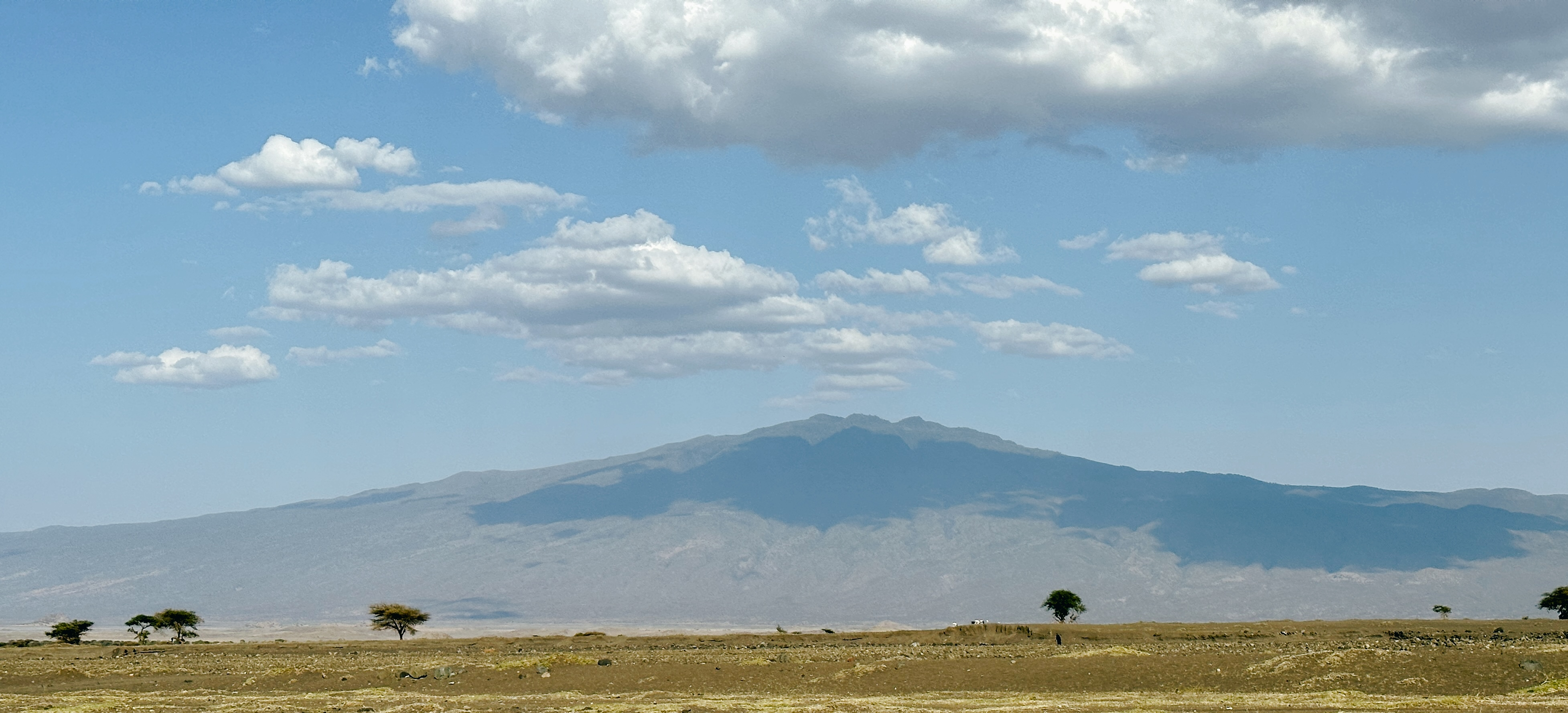
Gelai panorama, Longido District

The volcano falls within a game-controlled area that extends east to Longido District, within Arusha Region, where strict regulated hunting is permitted. This has caused an increase in the numbers of animals in the area due to anti poaching efforts provided by revenue from licensed hunters.

== See also ==
- List of volcanoes in Tanzania
