= Engarenaibor =

Ward in Longido, Arusha, Tanzania

- Ward
- Location within Tanzania
- Coordinates: 02°30′19″S 36°32′44″E
- Country: Tanzania
- Region: Arusha Region
- District: Longido District

Population (2022)
  - Total: 15,227

Engarenaibor is an administrative ward in the Longido District of the Arusha Region of Tanzania. According to the 2022 census, the ward has a total population of 15,227.
