= Engikaret =

Ward in Longido District, Arusha Region

Engikaret Ward Kata ya Engikaret (Swahili)}
- Ward
- Kata ya Engikaret
- Location within Tanzania
- Country: Tanzania
- Region: Arusha Region
- District: Longido District

Area
  - Total: 913.6 km^{2} (352.7 sq mi)
- Elevation: 1,433 m (4,701 ft)

Population (2012)
  - Total: 6,527
  - Density: 7.144/km^{2} (18.50/sq mi)

Engikaret is an administrative ward in the Longido District of the Arusha Region of Tanzania. The ward covers an area of 913.6 km^{2} (352.7 sq mi), and has an average elevation of 1,433 m (4,701 ft). According to the 2012 census, the ward has a total population of 6,527.
