= Longido District =

District of Arusha Region, Tanzania

Longido District Wilaya ya Longido (Swahili)
- District of Arusha
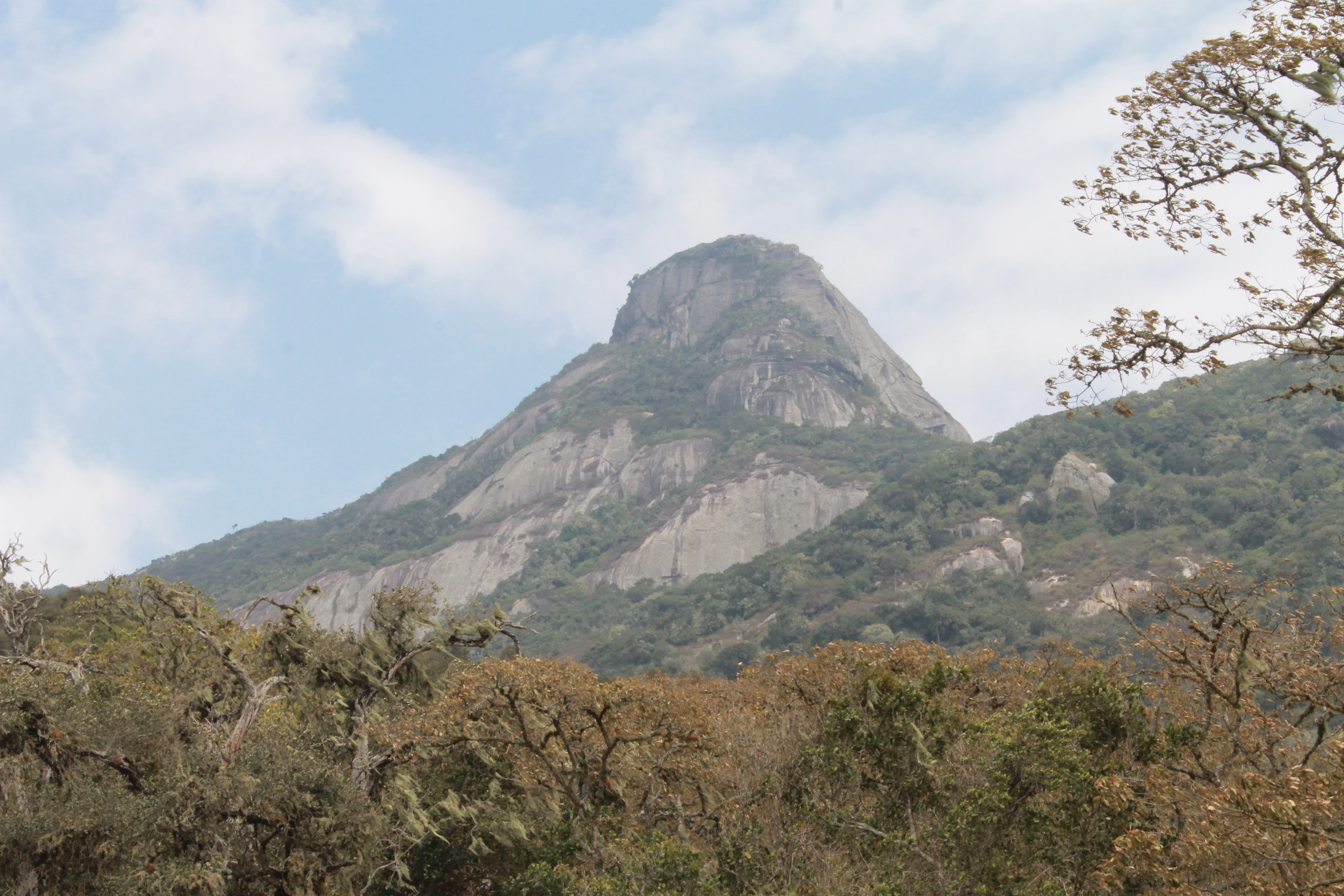
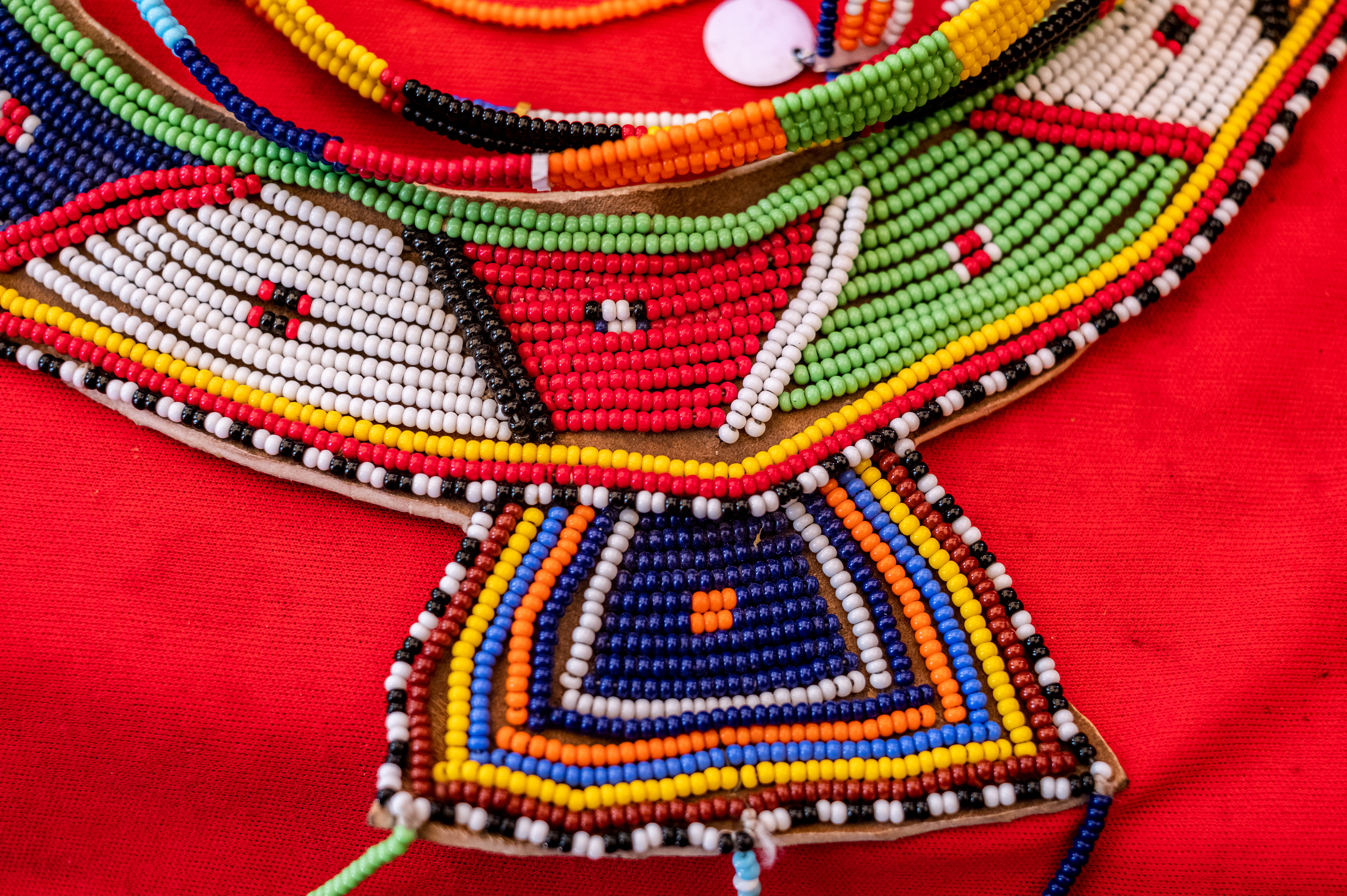
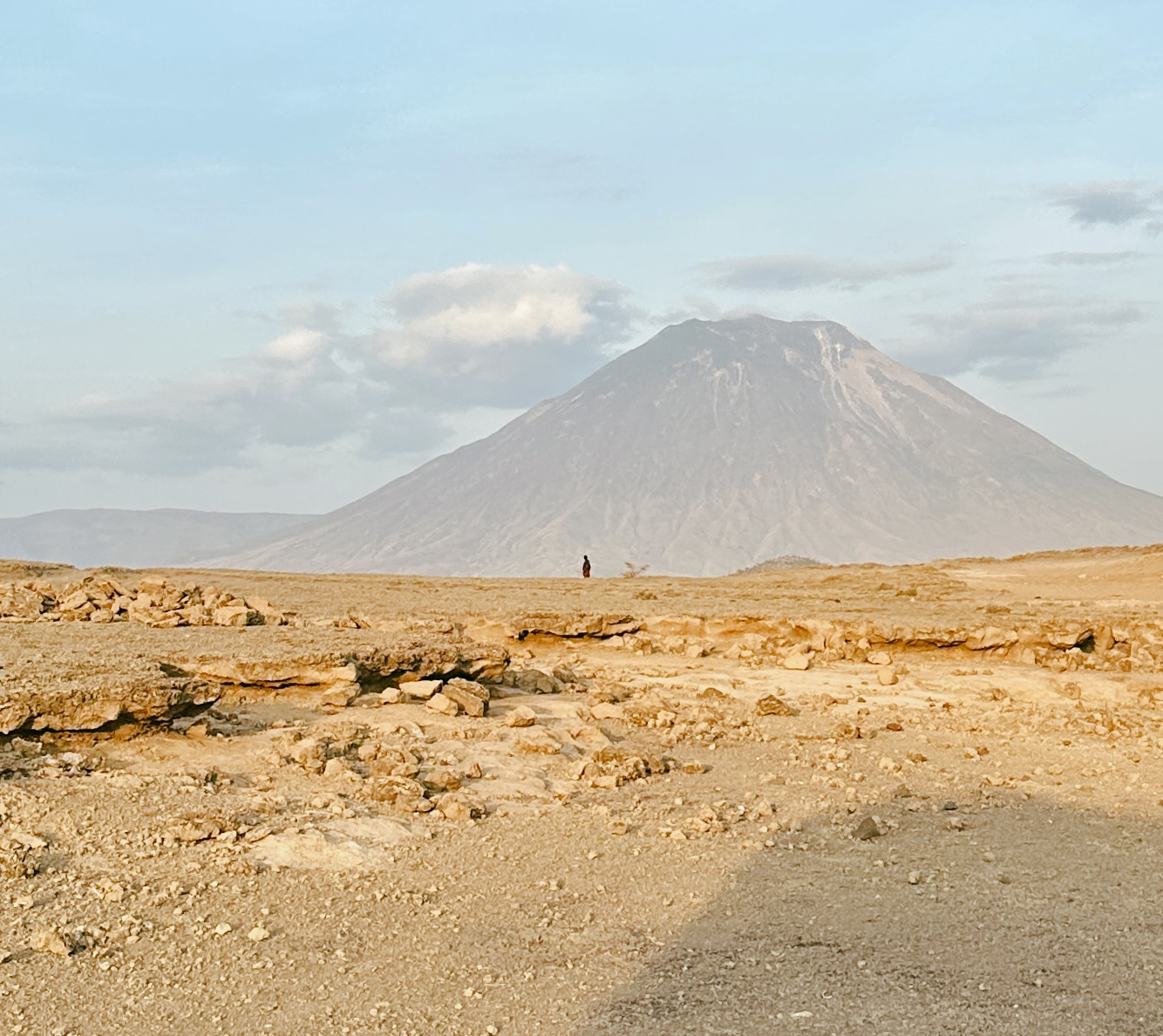
- From top to bottom: Mount Longido, Longido District and Maasai beads and Ol Doinyo Lengai view from Longido District
- Nickname: The gem district
- Longido District in Arusha
- Coordinates: 02°37′2.64″S 36°26′11.04″E
- Country: Tanzania
- Region: Arusha Region
- District: 1 July 2007
- Named for: Mount Longido
- Capital: Longido

Area
  - Total: 7,885 km^{2} (3,044 sq mi)
  - Rank: 2nd in Arusha
- Elevation: 1,387 m (4,551 ft)
- Highest elevation (Gelai): 2,942 m (9,652 ft)

Population (2022 census)
  - Total: 175,915
  - Rank: 7th in Arusha
  - Density: 22.31/km^{2} (57.78/sq mi)
- Demonym: Longidan

Ethnic groups
  - Settler: Maasai & Swahili
  - Native: Rwa & Sonjo
- Time zone: UTC+3 (EAT)
- Tanzanian Postcode: 235xx
- Website: Official website
- Symbols of Tanzania
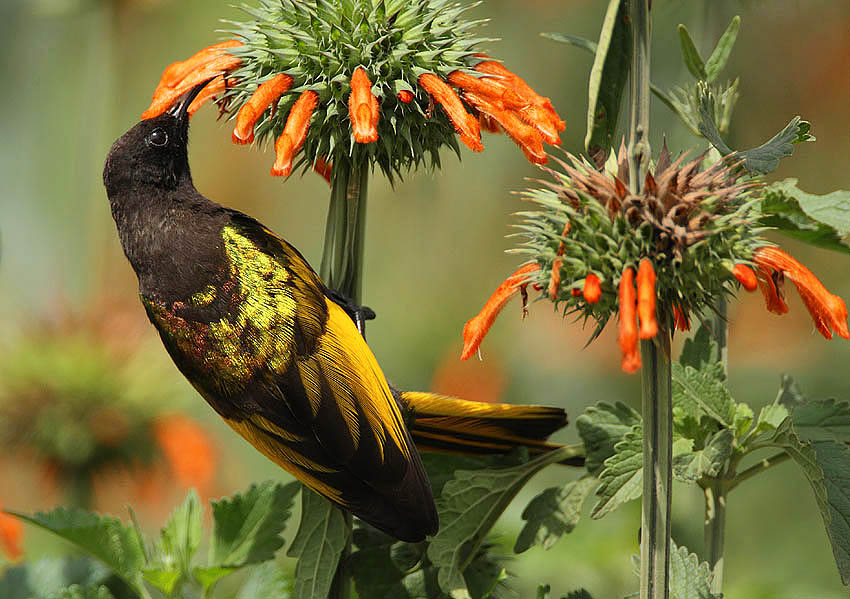
- Bird: Golden-winged sunbird

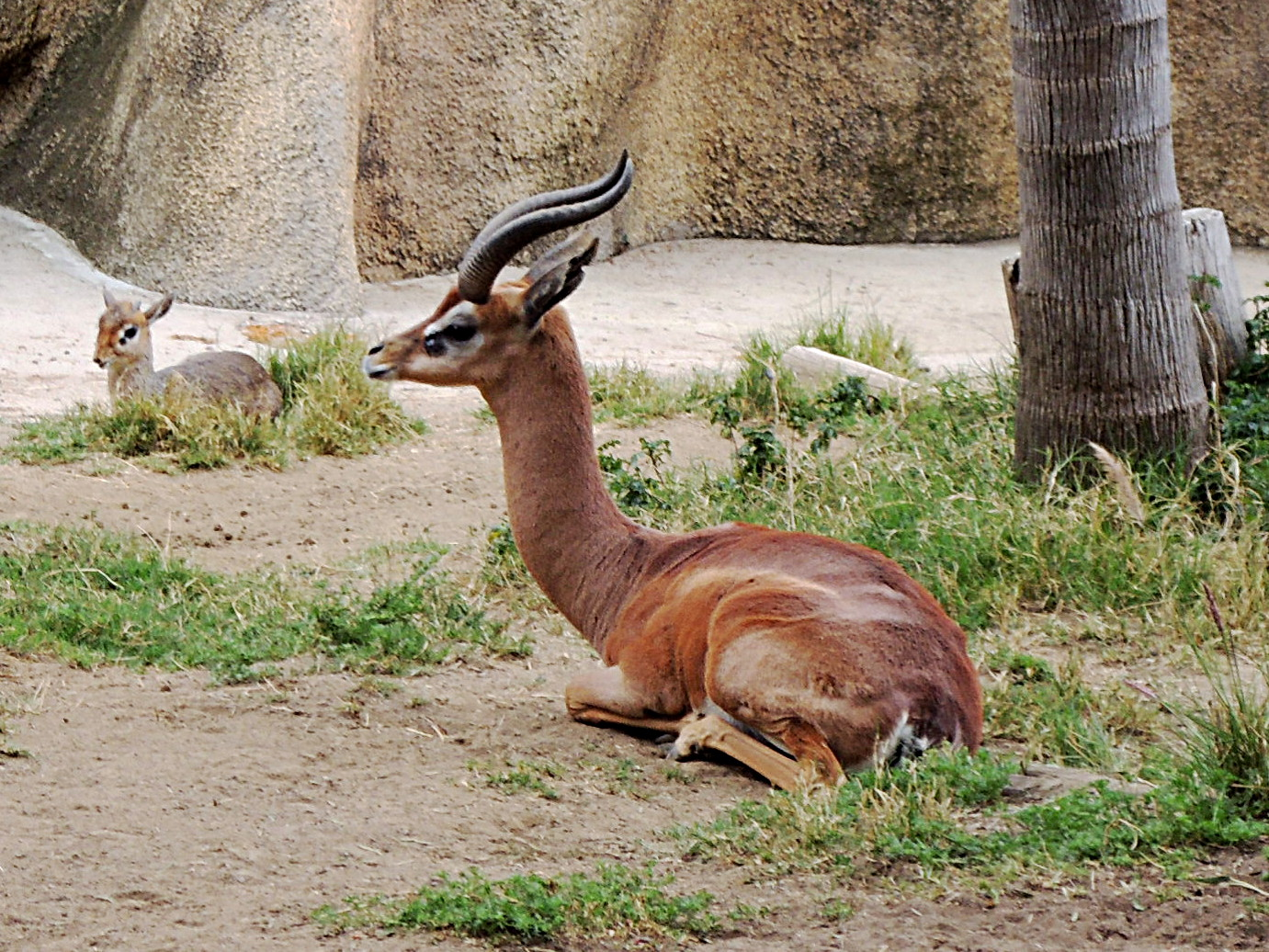
- Mammal: Gerenuk

Longido District (Wilaya ya Longido in Swahili) is one of seven districts of the Arusha Region of Tanzania. The district is bordered to the east by the Ngorongoro District, to the south west by the Monduli District and southeast by the Arusha Rural District and Meru District. To the far east by Siha District of Kilimanjaro Region and the north by Kenya. It covers an area of 7,885 km^{2} (3,044 sq mi). The district is comparable in size to the land area of Puerto Rico. Longido District was created in 2007 from Monduli District. Mount Longido, Gelai and Kitumbeine volcano are all located within the boundaries of the district. The administrative seat is the town of Longido. According to the 2022 census, the population of the district was 175,915. Longido District is known as Arusha's gem district, as it is home to Anyolite and Rubies.

== Geography ==
The District has an area of 7,782 square kilometers, of which 9.4% is arable land, equivalent to 73,164 hectares, and the remaining 82.14% is grazing land, equivalent to 639,235 hectares. In addition, woodland and rock cover 365.75 square kilometers of land, or 36575 hectares, or 4.7%.

=== Climate ===
The district is one of Tanzania's driest areas, with temperatures ranging from 20 °C to 35 °C with rainfall ranging from less than 500mm in the lowlands to 900mm in the high elevations of West Kilimanjaro, Ketumbeine, and Gelai mountains. It is Arusha's driest district.

=== Topography ===
The District has three types of soil: shallow soils that are poor and unsuitable for agriculture, deep freely drained soils that are rich in natural fertilizers but have a low infiltration rate, and deep freely drained soils that are appropriate for agricultural cultivation. Ketumbeine, Gelai, and Oldonyo Lengai Mountains are among the solitary mountains located in Longido District. The elevation ranges from 600m to 2,900m above sea level. The vegetation is diverse, including a mixed forest, bush regions, and grassland.

== Economy ==
TZS 14,787,392,620/= was calculated as the district's income (for the year 2002). According to these statistics, the annual per capita income for Longido District Council residents was around Tshs.199,630/=, compared to the Regional Tshs.286,000/=. The agriculture sector contributes about 5% of the district's income. Other sectors that contribute to district income include cattle, business, tourism, and minor industries, which account for 95% of district income. In terms of per capita income of the habitation every year, it is clear that poverty remains a problem for the inhabitants of Longido District Council.

=== Infrastructure ===
Almost all District water supply statistics show an alarming lack of water for both human and livestock use. The main causes of insufficient water supply, particularly in rural regions, are a lack of natural water sources such as springs and a lack of perennial rivers. Currently, 42% of Longido District Council residents have access to safe and clean drinking water from upgraded sources such as springs, bore holes, rain water, streams, rivers, and shallow wells.

The District road network has a total length of 563.9 kilometers, of which 229 kilometers are District roads, 355.9 kilometers are feeder roads, 36 kilometers are Urban roads, and 244 kilometers are under TANROAD. About 15.5% of road networks are in good shape, 45.4% are in medium shape, and 35.9% are in poor shape. 81.3% of the route is open all year, while 18.7% is closed during the rainy season. Paved trunk road T2 from Arusha to the Kenyan border town Namanga passes through the district.

=== Agriculture ===
Farming is the major economic activity of people in Longido District council. The land currently under cultivation is 29,223 Hectares or 3.76% of the total arable land which is 36,578 Hectares. About 6,158 of the population are engaged fully in agriculture which is 5% of the population, growing cash crops mainly wheat in the highlands. Food crops grown in the District include Horticultural crops, maize, beans, green beans and potatoes in the highlands and the rest in the lowlands of the district.

The District contains 117,000 livestock producers who own a range of livestock, including 234 dairy cattle, 356,430 beef cattle, 192,970 sheep, 455 pigs, 329,673 goats, and 11,123 donkeys.In the highlands, livestock are kept on a semi-intensive grazing system, whereas in the lowlands, most animals are grazed on communal land. The District currently has 24 cattle dips, 5 livestock development centers, 6 bulls centers, 2 slaughter houses, 14 slaughter slabs, 2 milk collection canters, and 14 livestock input outlets.

=== Tourism ===
There are campsites along Lake Natron, home to millions of flamingos and viewing of Oldonyolengai nature of active volcano eruptions, campsites within the species on the flat lands bounded by mountain of Kilimanjaro, Meru, Longido, Namanga (Kenyan Mountain), Gelai and Ketumbeine.

The District's projected forest area was 10,780 Hectares, or 13.7 percent of the total land area of 78,820 Hectares. Tanzania's wildlife is an important resource because it is the country's main tourist attraction and a major source of foreign exchange revenues. Approximately 95% of the District is a game-controlled region, making it a popular tourist destination. Tourists come for sport and trophy hunting in the District's four hunting blocks. There are over 40 kinds of fauna and a wide range of bird life, including migratory flamingos, which have their unique breeding place at Lake Natron. The number of wildlife animals in Longido District is estimated to be 100,000 (Ecosystem survey 1980), with a population density of 6.7 per square km (1984).

=== Mining ===
The District is primarily endowed with a variety of minerals, however the most minerals extracted are: ruby mining, soda ash extraction, limestone, and sand.

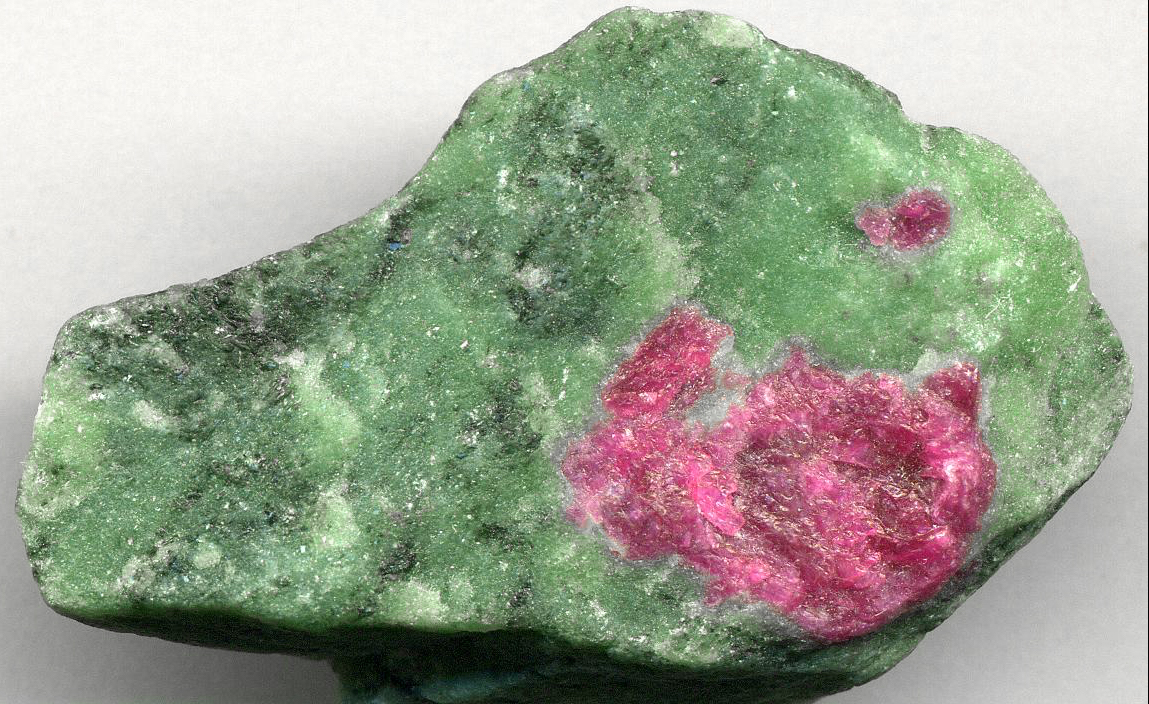
Anyolite (corundum-amphibole zoisitite) (Neoproterozoic; Mundarara Mine, about 27 km west of Longido, Tanzania) 1 (15098298782)

== Demographics ==
The Maasai are currently the dominant group in the district; they migrated to the district from Kenya in the 18th and 19th centuries. The original inhabitants of the district were the Rwa, Chagga & Sonjo. According to the 2012 National Population Census, the District had a total population of 123,153 people, of which 62,954 were females and 60,199 were males, with an annual growth rate of 3.8 when compared to the 2002 National Population Census, which counted a total of 74,074 people, of which 37,999 were females and 36,075 were males.

== Administrative subdivisions ==
The District is organized administratively into four Divisions (Longido, Ketumbeine, Engarenaibor, and Enduiment), 16 Wards, and 41 Villages.

=== Constituencies ===
For parliamentary elections, Arusha Region is divided into constituencies. As of the 2010 elections Longido District had one constituency, Longido Constituency.

=== Wards ===
The Longido District is administratively divided into sixteen wards:

- Elang'ata Dapash
- Engarenaibor
- Engikaret
- Gelai Lumbwa
- Gelai Meirugoi
- Iloirienito
- Kamwanga
- Kitumbeine
- Kimokouwa

- Longido
- Matale
- Mundarara
- Namanga
- Olmolog
- Orbomba
- Tingatinga

== Health and Education ==
=== Education ===
Longido District Council operates 45 elementary schools and 216 classrooms. The pupil-to-room ratio is 1:89, compared to a national norm of 1:40. As a result, the District has a shortage of 212 classrooms. There are 19,260 students, with 10,402 boys and 8,858 girls. Enrollment in Standard 7 has grown from 1,852 last year.

Longido District Council has a total of eight secondary schools, with seven government institutions and one private school, totaling 64 classrooms (Government schools). The pupil-to-classroom ratio is 1:71, compared to 1:40 nationally. As a result, the District has a shortage of 60 classrooms. Secondary enrollment went from 3,566 in 2010 to 4,758 in 2011, while those qualifying for further education increased from 196 in 2010 to 2014 in 2011, after an increase in the number of secondary schools and increasing community education awareness.

Students dropping out of school is an issue whose main causes are truancy, pregnancy, long commutes to school, early marriage, and a negative attitude toward formal education within the Maasai community there.

=== Healthcare ===
There are two Government health clinics, one FBO health facility, 22 Government dispensaries, and three FBO dispensaries in the District Council. The district does not have a district hospital; additionally, the required health centers are 16, but there are only three; and the required dispensaries are 41, but there are only 25 including FBO dispensaries.

There are 123 health personnel available out of a total of 292 required. Due to the lack of a District hospital, there are no specialist doctors; there is one Medical Doctor out of four required, one of whom should be a District Medical Officer; three Assistant Medical Doctors are required; and sixteen Clinical Officers are required. Out of the 72 required nurses, 42 are registered and enrolled.

ARI, Pneumonia, Malaria, intestinal worms, minor surgical condition, Diarrhoea, eye disorders, skin illnesses, ear conditions, and UTI are the top ten ailments for children aged five and up. PID and neurosis are also among the top ten to five.
