= Olmolog =

Ward in Longido District, Arusha Region

Olmolog Ward Kata ya Olmolog (Swahili)}
- Ward
- Kata ya Olmolog
- Location within Tanzania
- Country: Tanzania
- Region: Arusha Region
- District: Longido District

Area
  - Total: 338.7 km^{2} (130.8 sq mi)
- Elevation: 1,463 m (4,800 ft)

Population (2012)
  - Total: 8,764
  - Density: 25.88/km^{2} (67.02/sq mi)

Olmolog is an administrative ward in the Longido District of the Arusha Region of Tanzania. The ward covers an area of 338.7 km^{2} (130.8 sq mi), and has an average elevation of 1,463 m (4,800 ft). According to the 2012 census, the ward has a total population of 8,764. Its postcode is 23505.

Prior to the 2007 creation of Longido District, Olmolog was situated within the borders of Monduli District.
