= Kamwanga =

Ward in Longido District, Arusha Region

Kamwanga Ward Kata ya Kamwanga (Swahili)}
- Ward
- Kata ya Kamwanga
- Location within Tanzania
- Country: Tanzania
- Region: Arusha Region
- District: Longido District

Area
  - Total: 52.96 km^{2} (20.45 sq mi)
- Elevation: 1,693 m (5,554 ft)

Population (2012)
  - Total: 10,146
  - Density: 191.6/km^{2} (496.2/sq mi)

Kamwanga is an administrative ward in the Longido District of the Arusha Region of Tanzania. The ward covers an area of 52.96 km^{2} (20.45 sq mi), and has an average elevation of 1,693 m (5,554 ft). According to the 2012 census, the ward has a total population of 10,146.
