= Iloirienito =

Ward in Longido District, Arusha Region

Iloirienito Ward Kata ya Iloirienito (Swahili)}
- Ward
- Kata ya Iloirienito
- Location within Tanzania
- Country: Tanzania
- Region: Arusha Region
- District: Longido District

Area
  - Total: 140.1 km^{2} (54.1 sq mi)
- Elevation: 1,610 m (5,280 ft)

Population (2012)
  - Total: 5,571
  - Density: 39.76/km^{2} (103.0/sq mi)

Iloirienito is an administrative ward in the Longido District of the Arusha Region of Tanzania. The ward covers an area of 140.1 km^{2} (54.1 sq mi), and has an average elevation of 1,610 m (5,280 ft). According to the 2012 census, the ward has a total population of 5,571.
