= Matale (Tanzanian ward) =

Ward in Longido, Arusha, Tanzania

- Ward
- Location within Tanzania
- Coordinates: 02°30′25″S 33°06′22″E
- Country: Tanzania
- Region: Arusha Region
- District: Longido District

Population (2012)
  - Total: 4,411

Matale is an administrative ward in the Longido District of the Arusha Region of Tanzania. According to the 2012 census, the ward has a total population of 4,411.
