= Orbomba =

Ward in Longido District, Arusha Region

Orbomba Ward Kata ya Orbomba (Swahili)}
- Ward
- Kata ya Orbomba
- Location within Tanzania
- Country: Tanzania
- Region: Arusha Region
- District: Longido District

Area
  - Total: 630.0 km^{2} (243.2 sq mi)
- Elevation: 1,463 m (4,800 ft)

Population (2012)
  - Total: 7,900
  - Density: 13/km^{2} (32/sq mi)

Orbomba is an administrative ward in the Longido District of the Arusha Region of Tanzania. The ward covers an area of 630.0 km^{2} (243.2 sq mi), and has an average elevation of 1,463 m (4,800 ft). According to the 2012 census, the ward has a total population of 7,900.
