= Tingatinga (Tanzanian ward) =

Ward in Longido District, Arusha Region of Tanzania

Tingatinga is an administrative ward in the Longido District of the Arusha Region of Tanzania. According to the 2002 census, the ward has a total population of 4,811.
