= Kimokouwa =

Ward in Longido District, Arusha Region

Kimokouwa Ward Kata ya Kimokouwa (Swahili)}
- Ward
- Kata ya Kimokouwa
- Location within Tanzania
- Country: Tanzania
- Region: Arusha Region
- District: Longido District

Area
  - Total: 411.6 km^{2} (158.9 sq mi)
- Elevation: 1,327 m (4,354 ft)

Population (2012)
  - Total: 7,806
  - Density: 18.97/km^{2} (49.12/sq mi)

Kimokouwa is an administrative ward in the Longido District of the Arusha Region of Tanzania. The ward covers an area of 411.6 km^{2} (158.9 sq mi), and has an average elevation of 1,327 m (4,354 ft). According to the 2012 census, the ward has a total population of 7,806.
