= Simanjiro District =

Coordinates: 4°24′36″S 37°10′48″E

- District
- Simanjiro District of Manyara Region
- Country: Tanzania
- Region: Manyara Region

Area
  - Total: 19,816 km^{2} (7,651 sq mi)

Population (2022)
  - Total: 291,169
  - Density: 14.694/km^{2} (38.056/sq mi)

Simanjiro District is one of the six districts of the Manyara Region of Tanzania. It is bordered to the north by Arusha Region, to the north east by Kilimanjaro Region, to the south east by Tanga Region, to the south by Kiteto District, to the south west by Dodoma Region and to the west by Babati Rural District. The district headquarters are located in Orkesumet. According to the 2022 Tanzania National Census, the population of Simanjro District was 291,169. Simanjiro District is endowed with gemstones, being the only location on the planet that has tanzanite. Simanjiro was also where the first tsavolite was discovered.

== Administrative subdivisions ==
As of 2012, Simanjiro District was administratively divided into 17 wards.

Simanjiro District Wards
| Ward Number | Name | Population (2012 Census) | Notes |
|---|---|---|---|
| 1 | Orkesumet | 5,325 | District Seat of Government, translates to long wells of water in English. |
| 2 | Naberera | 19,814 | |
| 3 | Loiborsiret | 13,569 | |
| 4 | Emboreet | 8,860 | |
| 5 | Terrat | 8,586 | |
| 6 | Oljoro No. 5 | 15,527 | |
| 7 | Shambarai | 9,420 | |
| 8 | Mererani | 13,450 | |
| 9 | Msitu wa Tembo | 12,054 | Translates to elephant forest in English |
| 10 | Ngorika | 7,417 | |
| 11 | Liborsoit | 7,207 | |
| 12 | Ruvu Remiti | 5,077 | |
| 13 | Kitwai | 5,914 | |
| 14 | Komolo | 11,555 | |
| 15 | Naisinyai | 11,144 | |
| 16 | Endiamtu | 13,621 | |
| 17 | Endonyongijape | 10,153 | |

== Demographics ==
The 2012 Tanzanian Census reported that the district had a population of 178,693, with an average household size of 4.6 people. The 2002 Tanzanian Census reported that the district had a population of 141,676, with an average household size of 4.3 people.

Many of the district's inhabitants are ethnic Maasai. Many of the district's Maasai population are illiterate, have no formal education, and are practicing Christians.

== Economy ==
The area is home to the national gem of Tanzania, tanzanite. A rare gem only found in Mererani hills in Merereani ward in with Simanjiro District, Manyara Region. Masai millionai based in Arusha region, Saniniu Laizer made headlines in 2020 after mining three stones and selling them for approximately $5.4 million. Simanjiro's economy revolves around mining of tanzanite, however the district has not been able to reap the economic benefits of such a lucrative industry

Due to the district's predominant Maasai population the second largest industry is beef pastoral, with a 1994 report states that 71,531 Maasai in the district practice pastoralism. There are a significant number of extension agents in the district who sell agricultural information.

== Media ==
Orkonerei FM Radio, a Maasai language radio station is located in the town of Terrat.
