= Elang'ata Dapash =

Ward in Longido District, Arusha Region

Elang'ata Dapash Ward Kata ya Elang'ata Dapash (Swahili)}
- Ward
- Kata ya Elang'ata Dapash
- Location within Tanzania
- Country: Tanzania
- Region: Arusha Region
- District: Longido District

Area
  - Total: 450.3 km^{2} (173.9 sq mi)
- Elevation: 1,003 m (3,291 ft)

Population (2012)
  - Total: 10,221
  - Density: 22.70/km^{2} (58.79/sq mi)

Elang'ata Dapash is an administrative ward in the Longido District of the Arusha Region of Tanzania. The ward covers an area of 450.3 km^{2} (173.9 sq mi), and has an average elevation of 1,003 m (3,291 ft). According to the 2012 census, the ward has a total population of 10,221.
