= Kitumbeine, Longido =

Kitumbeine
- Location within Tanzania
- Coordinates: 2°44′S 36°16′E
- Country: Tanzania
- Region: Arusha Region
- District: Longido District

Population (2002)
  - Total: 13,629
- Source: 2002 Tanzania Population and Housing Census
- Time zone: UTC+3 (EAT)

Kitumbeine is an administrative ward in the Longido District of the Arusha Region of Tanzania. According to the 2002 census, the ward has a total population of 13,629.

== Electrification ==
Prior to 2016, the residents of Kitumbeine had no access to reliable electricity. This changed when one of Mini-Grid developers in Tanzania electrified the village fueling socio-economic growth in the village. The move is in line with the government initiative to ensure energy access and connectivity to all citizen following the opt-in to the SE4ALL goals.
