= Anyolite =

Metamorphic rock

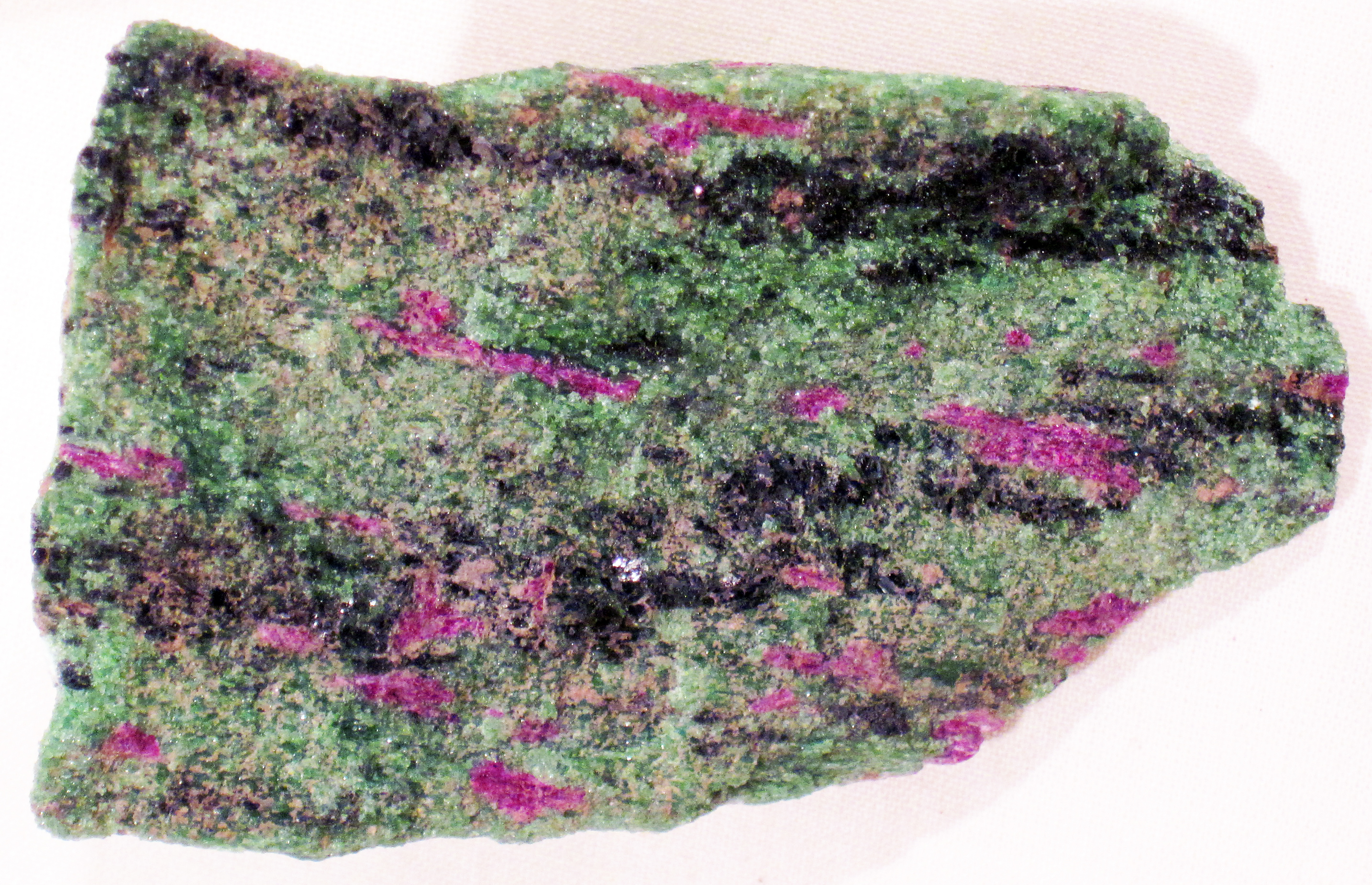
Anyolite from Mundarara Mine, Tanzania. Red colored ruby inclusions are visible.

Anyolite is a metamorphic rock composed of intergrown green zoisite, black/dark green pargasite and ruby. It has been found in the Arusha Region of Tanzania and in Austria. It is sometimes incorrectly advertised as a variety of the mineral zoisite. The term anyolite is, however, not an officially accepted term for a metamorphic rock. Its name derives from the Maasai word anyoli, meaning "green". Anyolite is also referred to as ruby in zoisite, ruby zoisite, ruby-zoisite or Tanganyika artstone.

The contrasting colours make anyolite a popular material for sculptures and other decorative objects. It was first discovered at the Mundarara Mine, near Longido, Tanzania in 1954.

In 2010, it was suggested that a 2 kilogram stone known as the Gem of Tanzania owned by the defunct company Wrekin Construction and fraudulently valued at £11 million was actually a lump of anyolite worth about £100, although it was eventually sold for £8000. It is reported that the stone originally came from a mine near Arusha, Tanzania.

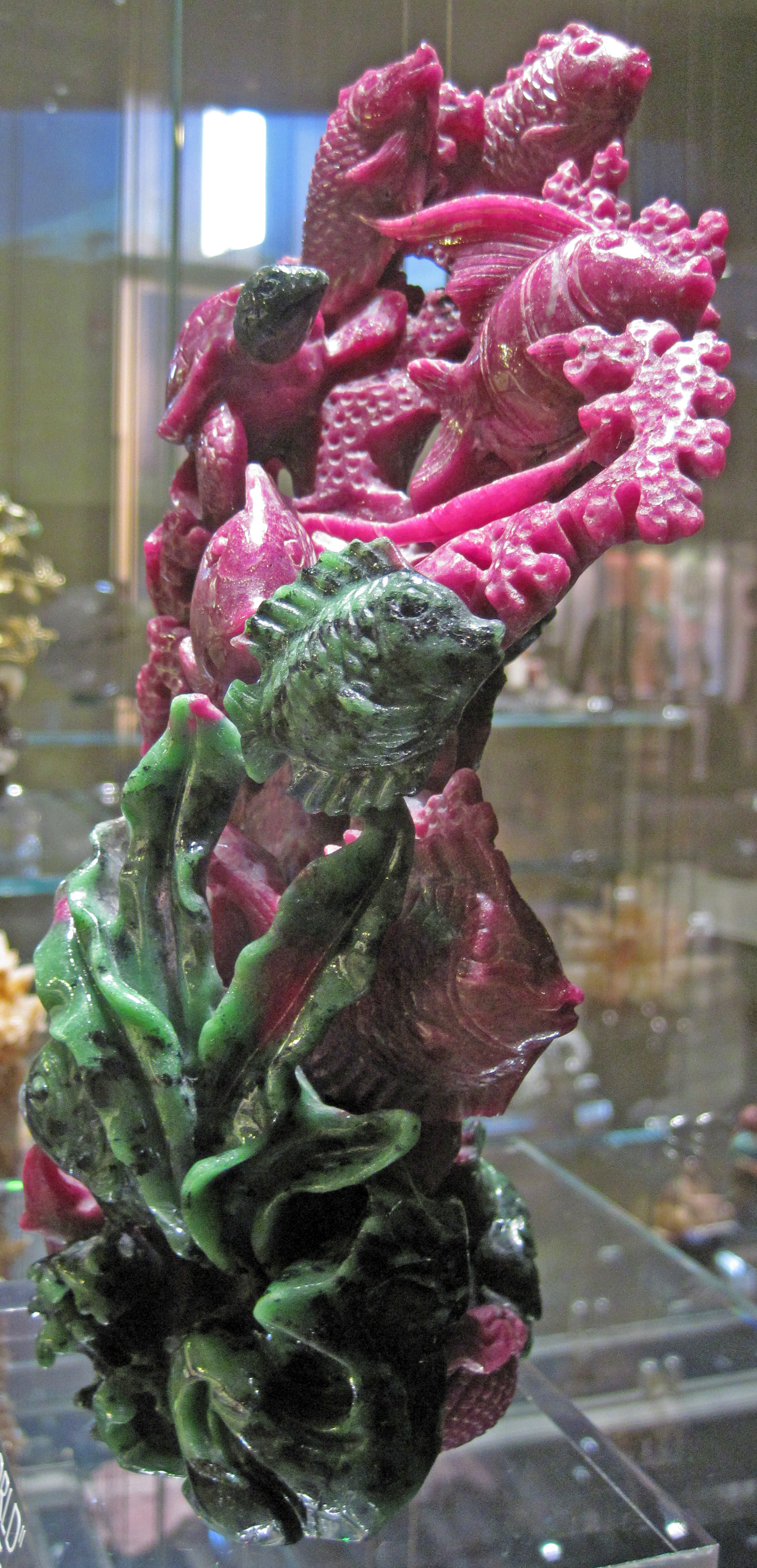
Anyolite figurine
